= Heimdal (company) =

Danish cybersecurity company

- Formerly: Heimdal Security
- Type: Private company
- Industry: Cybersecurity
- Founded: March 2014, Copenhagen, Denmark
- Founder: Morten Kjærsgaard
- Headquarters: Copenhagen, Denmark
- Key people: Morten Kjærsgaard (Chairman); Jesper Frederiksen (CEO)
- Website: heimdalsecurity.com

Heimdal is a Danish cybersecurity company.

== History ==
In 2014, Heimdal was launched in Copenhagen, under the name Heimdal Security. That same year, it joined Operation Tovar, an international effort against the Zeus ransomware.

Between 2016 and 2018, Heimdal expanded its product suite to include antivirus capabilities, firewall management, and AI-powered DNS detection. Between 2016 and 2021, the company received multiple Cybersecurity Awards (CSA) for its anti-malware and AI-driven security products. In 2019, Heimdal acquired the software company BasicBytes.

In 2020, the firm itself was acquired by Marlin Equity Partners and subsequently added email security and perimeter DNS protection to its offerings. In 2021 and 2022, Heimdal introduced remote desktop tools, a security operations center (SOC), and a Threat-Hunting and Action Center. In 2023, the company rebranded and shifted its focus toward an extended detection and response (XDR) platform.
