= Greg Martin (businessman) =

American cybersecurity expert and entrepreneur (born 1981)

- Born: 1981 (age 44–45); Dallas, Texas
- Occupations: Software developer, businessman

Greg Martin (born 1981) is an American cybersecurity researcher and businessman. He is the founder of two cybersecurity companies, Anomali and JASK, the latter of which was acquired by Sumo Logic in 2019.

Martin is credited with inventing the first threat intelligence platform (TIP), and is the creator of the open source honeypot project "Modern Honey Network".

== Early life and education ==
Martin was born in 1981 in Dallas and grew up in working-class Waxahachie, Texas. A self proclaimed autodidact, he taught himself taught himself to write code on his family's personal computer, an IBM 8086 clone.

In 2015, Martin launched cloud security and artificial intelligence company JASK in San Francisco.

In 2022, Martin co-founded cybersecurity company Ghost Security, based in Austin, Texas, where he is chief executive officer. Martin resides in Austin, Texas with his family.

Martin serves as a cybersecurity industry resource.
