= Open Threat Exchange =

Crowd-sourced computer-security platform

- Developers: AlienVault (now AT&T Cybersecurity)
- Type: Security / SIEM
- Website: cybersecurity.att.com/open-threat-exchange

Open Threat Exchange (OTX) is a crowd-sourced computer-security platform. It has more than 180,000 participants in 140 countries who share more than 19 million potential threats daily. It is free to use.

Founded in 2012, OTX was created and is run by AlienVault (now AT&T Cybersecurity), a developer of commercial and open source solutions to manage cyber attacks. The collaborative threat exchange was created partly as a counterweight to criminal hackers successfully working together and sharing information about viruses, malware and other cyber attacks.

== Components ==
OTX is cloud-hosted. Information sharing covers a wide range of security-related issues, including viruses, malware, intrusion detection and firewalls. Its automated tools cleanse, aggregate, validate and publish data shared by participants. The OTX platform validates the data, then strips the information identifying the participating contributor.

In 2015, OTX 2.0 added a social network, enabling members to share, discuss and research security threats, including via a real-time threat feed. Users can share the IP addresses or websites from where attacks originated or look up specific threats to see if anyone has already left such information.

Users can subscribe to a “Pulse,” an analysis of a specific threat, including data on IoC, impact, and the targeted software. Pulses can be exported as STIX, JSON, OpenloC, MAEC and CSV, and can be used to update local security products automatically. Users can up-vote and comment on specific pulses to assist others in identifying the most important threats.

OTX combines social contributions with automated machine-to-machine tools that integrate with major security products such as firewalls and perimeter security hardware. The platform can read security reports in .pdf, .csv, .json and other open formats. Relevant information is extracted automatically, assisting IT professionals in analyzing data more readily.

Specific OTX components include a dashboard with details about the top malicious IPs around the world and to check the status of specific IPs; notifications should an organization's IP or domain be found in a hacker forum, blacklist or be listed by OTX; and a feature to review log files to determine if there has been communication with known malicious IPs.

In 2016, AlienVault released a new version of OTX, allowing participants to create private communities and discussion groups to share information on threats only within the group. The feature is intended to facilitate more in-depth discussions on specific threats, particular industries, and different regions worldwide. Threat data from groups can also be distributed to subscribers of managed service providers using OTX."

== Technology ==
OTX is a large data platform that integrates natural language processing and machine learning. It uses these features to facilitate the collection and correlation of data from many sources, including third-party threat feeds, websites, external APIs and local agents.

== Partners ==
In 2015, AlienVault partnered with Intel to coordinate real-time threat information on OTX. A similar deal with Hewlett Packard was announced the same year.

== Competitors ==
Both Facebook and IBM have threat exchange platforms. The Facebook ThreatExchange is in beta and requires an application or invitation to join. IBM launched IBM X-Force Exchange in April 2015.
