= Trustwave Holdings =

American commercial cybersecurity company

Trustwave Holdings, Inc.
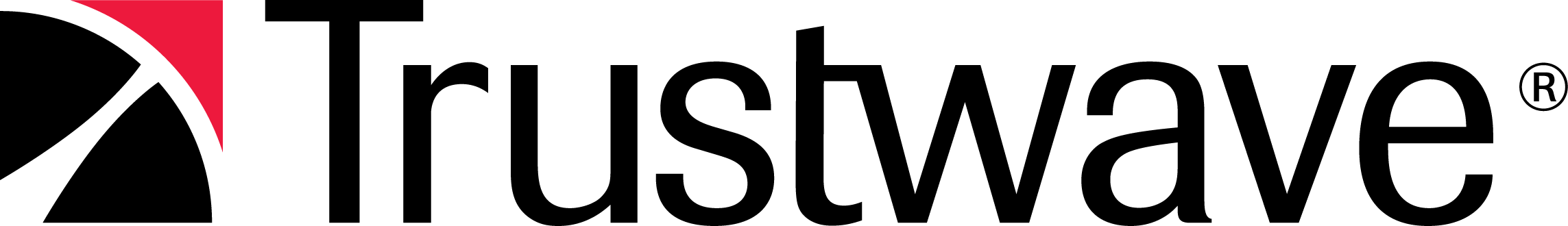
- Trade name: Trustwave
- Type: Subsidiary
- Industry: Managed Security Services; Information Security; Cloud computing
- Founded: 1995; 31 years ago
- Headquarters: Chicago, Illinois, USA
- Area served: Worldwide
- Key people: Eric Harmon (CEO)
- Revenue: US $216 million (2014)
- Number of employees: 1,600+
- Parent: Singtel; (2015–24); The Chertoff Group; (2024–25); LevelBlue; (2025–present)
- Website: www.trustwave.com

Trustwave Holdings, Inc. is an American cybersecurity subsidiary of LevelBlue. It focuses on providing managed detection and response (MDR), managed security services (MSS), database security, and email security to organizations around the globe.

With customers in 96 countries, it has its international headquarters in downtown Chicago and regional offices in London, São Paulo, and Sydney. The company also operates Security Operations Centers in Chicago, Denver, Manila, Minneapolis, Singapore, Sydney, Tokyo, Warsaw, and Waterloo, Ontario.

As of 2015, the firm was a standalone business unit cybersecurity independent subsidiary and brand of multinational telecommunications company Singtel. On August 19, 2025, one year after The Chertoff Group purchased the company, Trustware was acquired by LevelBlue.

== History ==
In April 2011, Trustwave Holdings filed for its IPO, though it never completed the process. In May 2014, Trustwave withdrew its application, citing unfavorable market conditions. Trustwave's website says the company has more than 1,600 employees.

In February 2014, Trustwave SVP Phillip. J. Smith offered expert testimony related to data breaches and malware as part of a Congressional hearing for The House Committee on Energy and Commerce. In his prepared testimony, he presented observations based on the company's experience investigating thousands of data breaches, ongoing malware and security research and other forms of threat intelligence.

On April 8, 2015 (SGT), Singapore Telecommunications Ltd (Singtel) announced it had entered into a definitive agreement to acquire Trustwave Holdings, Inc. for a fee of $810 million—Singtel with a 98% stake in the company leaving 2% with Trustwave's CEO and President. According to media reports and Singtel filings on the Singapore Exchange, the enterprise value of Trustwave at the time of the deal was $850 million.

In October 2021, it sold its PCI compliance business to cybersecurity firm Sysnet for $80 million. The sale gave Trustwave the ability to invest more in its core capabilities of managed detection and response (MDR) and managed security services (MSS), according to research firm IDC.

In January 2024, it was announced that The Chertoff Group had completed its acquisition of the firm for $205 million. In July 2025, LevelBlue acquired the Trustwave Holdings.

== Significant discoveries ==
In 2013 and again in 2014 Trustwave SpiderLabs did an analysis of primary Pony botnet controllers. The results of the analysis found that the botnets had gathered more than two million passwords and credentials for accounts on ADP payroll, Facebook, Twitter, Yahoo and more, and over US $220,000 in crypto-currency like Bitcoin.

In June 2020, Trustwave SpiderLabs discovered a new malware family, which they named GoldenSpy, embedded in tax payment software that a Chinese bank requires corporations to install to conduct business operations in China. Trustwave said it was uncertain whether the malware was embedded in all of the tax software or if it was deployed against specific targets. The FBI sent a subsequent warning about this malware threat to companies in healthcare, chemical, and finance industries.

Leading up to the 2020 U.S. presidential election, Trustwave SpiderLabs found a hacker selling info on 186 million U.S. voters during its Dark Web and cybercriminal forum research. Trustwave turned this information over to the FBI.

In February 2021, Trustwave SpiderLabs discovered two "severe" vulnerabilities in SolarWinds Orion. One of the flaws could’ve allowed a hacker to gain complete remote control of a targeted SolarWinds system. Patches were released January 25 and customers of SolarWinds were urged to patch immediately.

== Criticism ==
Trustwave operates an X.509 certificate authority ("CA") which is used as the top level of trust by many web browsers, operating systems, and other applications (a "trusted root CA"). In 2011, Trustwave sold a certificate for a subordinate CA which allowed a customer to present SSL certificates identifying as arbitrary entities, in a similar mechanism to a "Man in the Middle Attack". This type of action is similar to the practice of running an SSL proxy on a corporate network, though in this case a public subordinate CA (valid anywhere) was used instead of an internal corporate-generated domain CA (valid only for machines that accept it as part of organizational policy), making the risk of abuse much higher.

In March 2014, Trustwave was named in a lawsuit filed by Trustmark National Bank and Green Bank N.A. The lawsuit alleges that Trustwave failed to provide the promised level of security to Target, and for failing to meet industry security standards. In April 2014, a notice of dismissal was filed by both plaintiffs, effectively withdrawing their earlier allegations.
