= Finjan Holdings =

- Company type: Private
- Traded as: Nasdaq: FNJN
- Founded: 1997; 29 years ago
- Founder: Shlomo Touboul
- Headquarters: San Jose, California, United States
- Products: products for licensing of intellectual property

Finjan Holdings is a company that focuses on the licensing of intellectual property. Finjan claims to own patented technology used in enterprise web security tools. Formerly a publicly traded company on NASDAQ (FNJN), it was acquired by the Fortress Investment Group in 2020.

Finjan has filed a large number of lawsuits against leading software security companies asserting its patents including against: Cisco, Palo Alto Networks, Symantec, Blue Coat Systems, Sophos, Trend Micro, ESET, Bitdefender, Check Point, Qualys, Rapid7, Fortinet and others. As such, Finjan has been named a patent troll.

The original hardware and software divisions of Finjan were acquired by M86 Security in 2009. Finjan continues to hold patents for various Web security technologies and licenses these patents to Trustwave (formerly M86) among others. The company is headquartered in East Palo Alto, California.

== History ==
Finjan was founded in 1997 by Shlomo Touboul, a serial entrepreneur who founded his first company, Shani Computers, in 1985 and sold it to Intel in 1994. He then worked for Intel for a while before starting Finjan. In 1998 Touboul decided to bring in an experienced seasoned CEO, who would be able to develop and grow the company more quickly, he then left to start his own venture capital fund.

In 2001, the company ran into financial difficulties and Touboul was asked by the board of directors to rejoin the company as CEO. Touboul realigned the company's strategy, moving away from developing only software solutions to combining hardware and software security appliances; additionally, the company moved to a channel sales model. In December 2002 Finjan acquired the assets of Alchemedia, a software developer with a DRM product called Clever Content, and several DRM patents; Alchemedia also had ties to Israel, as its founder, Daniel Schreiber, was Israeli, though the company was technically headquartered in the Dallas area. In 2005, following disagreements with the board, Touboul left again and started a new company, Yoggie Security Systems.

In October 2007, Éric Benhamou, former CEO and chairman of 3COM was appointed as chairman of Finjan. He also invested in the company through his venture capital fund - Benhamou Global Ventures.

In November 2009, the hardware and software divisions of Finjan were sold to M86 Security, a global computer security firm based in Orange, California, with international headquarters in London and offices worldwide. M86 was subsequently acquired by Trustwave, which still uses Finjan's technology patents under a licensing agreement.

In June 2013, Finjan became a publicly traded company capitalized with $30 million, installed a new management team, and began a more focused program to license the company's landmark intellectual property. In May 2014, Finjan was listed on the NASDAQ Capital Market under the trading symbol "FNJN" where the company continues to trade today.

== Investors ==
Finjan's initial shareholders included Cisco, Microsoft, Bessemer Venture Partners, Benchmark Capital, HarbourVest Partners and Israel Seed Partners. In November 2008, the company secured an additional investment of $22 million, which brought the total capital invested in Finjan since its founding to $67 million. In June 2013, Finjan became a publicly traded company capitalized with $30 million, installed a new management team, and began a more focused program to license the company's landmark intellectual property. In May 2014, Finjan was listed on the NASDAQ Capital Market under the trading symbol "FNJN".

== Finjan's patent litigation practices ==
Finjan is known to engage in dubious litigation practices.

In one case (Finjan v. Check Point), Finjan's attorney filed a false declaration stating she had personal knowledge of certain facts, which the court found to be "problematic". The court then took the drastic measure of striking this declaration.

In another case (Finjan v. Juniper), the District Judge found that Finjan's attorney made an "absolutely false statement" and concluded in saying "I spent some time on this. And it turns out it was just BS. It was just big firm BS."

In the same case, Finjan provided sworn testimony that it had put Juniper on notice of infringing its patent in a phone call. During the trial, in front of the jury, it was discovered that the phone call had been (legally) recorded. Finjan's witness then admitted that their sworn testimony was untrue. Remarkably, Finjan's witness further admitted on cross-examination at trial that, if it weren't for the recording, he would still be testifying that proper notice of infringement was given.

Q. I’m asking you about whether you mentioned Sky ATP, and you swore and you took an oath and you said you had. That’s correct isn’t it???

A. I believe -- I believed I had, yes.

Q. That’s right. And if we did not have that transcript, that is still the testimony you would be giving today; isn’t that right?

A. That’s correct.

In a separate Order, the district Judge further stated that: "In no way does this order vindicate [Finjan's attorneys]. Their conduct was improper and frustrated the fairness of the proceedings. Judges in the future should take this into account when dealing with them in future cases."

== Intellectual property and technology ==
Finjan claims to have invented the concept of proactive content security with behavior-based content analysis technology, a claim not shared by others. This and other selected technology patents were licensed to Microsoft in July 2005. In April 2009, Finjan's intellectual property portfolio included granted and pending patents in the areas of behavior-based security and digital rights management. Finjan's portfolio includes processes that enable networks to execute security plans that counteract the effects of polymorphic code designed to hide malware.
