= Managed detection and response =

Cybersecurity service

Managed detection and response (or MDR) is a type of cybersecurity service providing customers with a cyberdefense technology and the associated remotely delivered human expertise. Those services help organizations monitor, detect, analyze and respond to advanced cyber threats. MDR is a form of managed security service (MSS).

== Concept ==
MDR aims to address the growing cybersecurity skills gap faced by many organizations and overwhelmed security teams dealing with increasing volumes of alerts. It offers continuous threat monitoring, detection, investigation, and response by leveraging technologies like endpoint detection and response tools.

MDR involves outsourcing threat hunting and incident response functions to teams of cybersecurity experts at the provider. It allows resource-constrained organizations to augment their security capabilities and address advanced, targeted cyberattacks and complex threats they may lack the in-house resources and skills to handle alone.

Key features of MDR include: 24/7 monitoring and analysis by security experts, investigation and prioritization of threats, detailed remediation recommendations, access to advanced tools and threat intelligence, ongoing threat-hunting services.

== Market size ==
Gartner predicts that 50% of all enterprises will have adopted MDR services for their cybersecurity by 2025. According to a report by the Fortune Business Insights of 2023, the MDR Market size is to reach 6.29 billion $ in 2030.

In 2025, two trends emerged in the MDR market: detection engineering and security posture management.

== See also ==
- Endpoint detection and response
- Endpoint security
- Extended detection and response
- Breach and attack simulation
- Security orchestration
