= Prompt book =

Theatrical production script

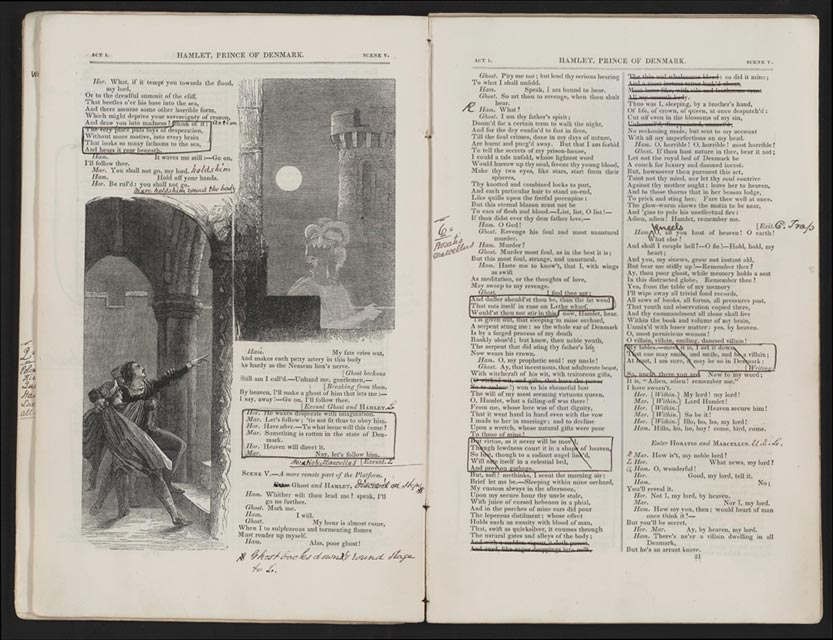
Pages from the American actress Charlotte Cushman's prompt-book for a production of Hamlet at the Washington Theater, 1861

The prompt book, also called transcript, the bible or sometimes simply the book, is the copy of a production script that contains the information necessary to create a theatrical production from the ground up. It is a compilation of all blocking, business, light, speech and sound cues, lists of properties, drawings of the set, contact information for the cast and crew, and any other relevant information that might be necessary to help the production run smoothly.

In modern theatrical productions, the prompt book is generally maintained and kept by the stage manager, with differences in the specific construction and organization to suit the style of the stage manager keeping the book, and the type of production (legitimate theatre, musical theatre, dance, opera, etc.).

== Description and use ==
Modern prompt books will tend to be constructed using binders with multiple tab dividers, with the page of the production attached to a larger sheet of paper to provide more margin space for taking notes. Markings to the script (for cues, notes, etc.) are typically done in pencil, and either in the margins or on the blank side of the back of the opposing page.

In situations where there are multiple stage managers or assistants, it is not uncommon for many copies of the prompt book to exist. Generally a lead stage manager will keep the master book, which is then copied by assistants on a nightly basis to account for any new information inserted during rehearsals, productions, and meetings. While all prompt books will contain some of the same basic information (script, cast list, contact information, set drawings, etc.), there is no official standard, and individual stage managers will determine the best way of keeping books for themselves and the productions they manage. While Actors' Equity Association, the union governing professional stage managers in the United States, does not publish any official pragma for a prompt book, such practices are often covered as part of college curricula, and many books exist on the subject.

== History ==
Prompt books were originally used by a prompter to much the same effect that they are today used by deputy stage managers. During the period spanning from the mid 17th through the early 19th centuries, rehearsal periods were generally very short by modern standards: a period of 1–2 weeks for three hours a day was common. Performances were likewise unpolished by modern standards, even when taking into account the theatrical conventions of the time, and so it was necessary to have a prompter standing by to assist actors with lines, blocking, and business—all of which the prompter would need to have recorded in their book.

In practice, prompters were also responsible for copying sides of the script for the company's actors, giving cues for music and scene shifts, securing licenses for plays, and assessing fines for actors who failed to attend rehearsals—in keeping with the duties of a modern stage manager. The records that prompters kept in their books are some of the most valuable resources available to modern scholars for understanding historical theatrical practice in the period.

As audience expectations for spectacle evolved in the 19th century, prompt books were published to describe the techniques involved in constructing complex scenery and special effects. These prompt books more closely resemble instructional works on how to create scenery, as they often included recommendations for simplification for less well-equipped theatres, than they do a modern prompt book.

== Examples ==
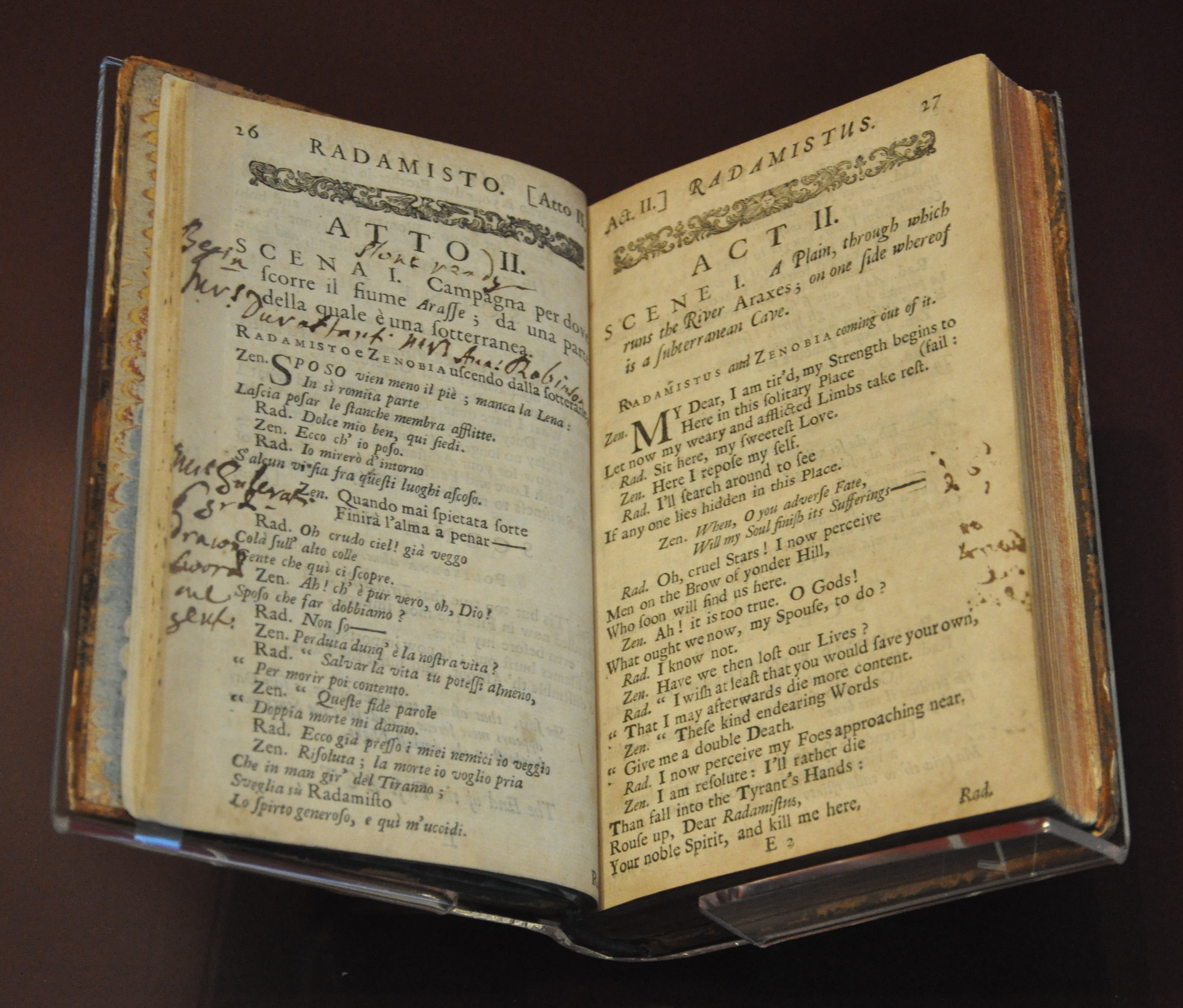
Prompt book for Radamisto, 1720

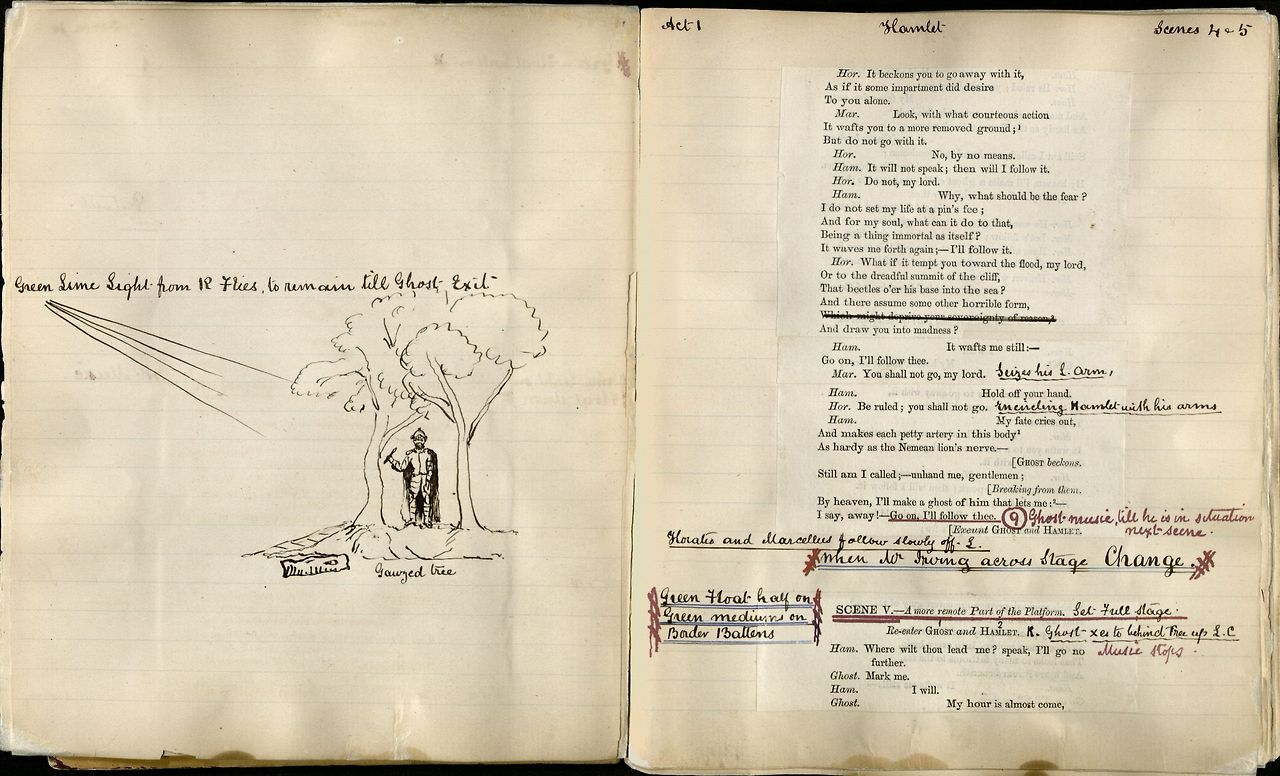
The prompt book from a 1874 staging of Hamlet by English actor and manager Henry Irving

While at Hofstra, Francis Ford Coppola learned about the idea of a prompt book, so he used the technique to produce his 1972 Paramount release of The Godfather. In a three-ring binder he kept an "annotated copy of the novel, scene-by-scene breakdowns, notes on the times and setting, cliches to avoid and casting ideas." In 2016 Coppola released a published replica of this prompt book as The Godfather Notebook as well as a signed $500 limited edition in a three-ring binder.

== See also ==
- Bible (screenwriting)
- Cue card
- Runbook

== Bibliography ==
1. Brockett, Oscar G. (1999). 'History of the Theatre (8th ed.). Boston, MA, USA: Allyn and Bacon.
