= Security information management =

Security information management (SIM) is an information security industry term for the collection of data such as log files into a central repository for trend analysis.

== Overview ==
SIM products generally are software agents running on the computer systems that are monitored. The recorded log information is then sent to a centralized server that acts as a "security console". The console typically displays reports, charts, and graphs of that information, often in real time. Some software agents can incorporate local filters to reduce and manipulate the data that they send to the server, although typically from a forensic point of view you would collect all audit and accounting logs to ensure you can recreate a security incident.

The security console is monitored by an administrator who reviews the consolidated information and takes action in response to any alerts issued.

The data that is sent to the server to be correlated and analyzed are normalized by the software agents into a common form, usually XML. Those data are then aggregated in order to reduce their overall size.

== Terminology ==
The terminology can easily be mistaken as a reference to the whole aspect of protecting one's infrastructure from any computer security breach. Due to historic reasons of terminology evolution; SIM refers to just the part of information security which consists of discovery of 'bad behavior' or policy violations by using data collection techniques. The term commonly used to represent an entire security infrastructure that protects an environment is commonly called information security management (InfoSec).

Security information management is also referred to as log management and is different from SEM (security event management), but makes up a portion of a SIEM (security information and event management) solution.

== See also ==
- Information security
- Information security management
- Information security management system
- Security Information and Event Management
- Security event manager
- Gordon–Loeb model for cyber security investments
