= Illusive Networks =

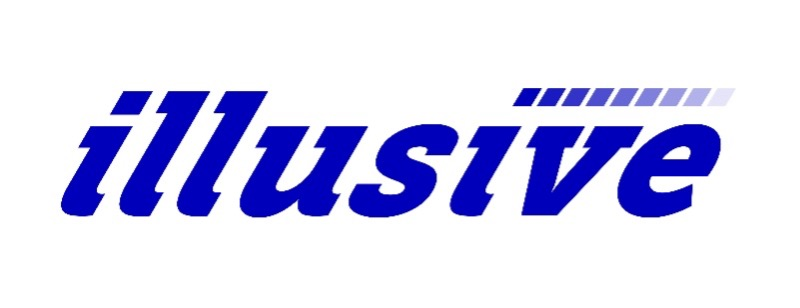
- Company type: Private
- Industry: Cybersecurity
- Founded: 2014
- Headquarters: Tel Aviv, Israel; New York City, USA
- Area served: Global
- Key people: Ofer Israeli (CEO, Founder); Shlomo Touboul (First CEO); Nadav Zafrir (Chairman)
- Products: Security software
- Website: Official Website

Illusive Networks is a cybersecurity firm headquartered in Tel Aviv, Israel and New York. The company produces technology that stops cyber attackers from moving laterally inside networks by finding and eliminating errant credentials and connections, planting deceptive information about given network's resources, emulating devices, and deploying high interactivity decoys. Network administrators are alerted when cyber attackers use security deceptions in an attempt to exploit the network. Illusive Networks is the first company launched by the Tel Aviv-based incubator, Team8. In June 2015, Illusive Networks received $5 million in Series A funding from Team8. To date, it has raised over $54M.

== History ==
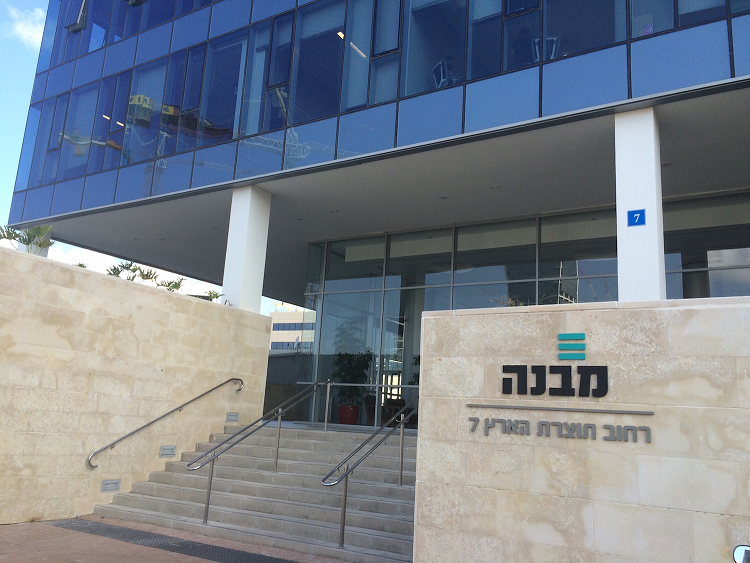
Illusive Networks headquarters in Tel Aviv

Illusive Networks was founded in 2014 by Team8 and Ofer Israeli. In Jan 2015 Shlomo Touboul joined as the company CEO. In June 2015, Illusive received $5 million in Series A funding from cybersecurity incubator Team8. Team8 is funded by a group of investors, including Google Chairman Eric Schmidt's venture capital fund, Innovation Endeavors, Alcatel-Lucent, Cisco Systems, Marker LLC, Bessemer Venture Partners, and others. While in Israel at the 5th Annual International Cybersecurity Conference in 2015, Schmidt paid a visit to Illusive Networks' headquarters on June 9 during the company's official launch. The company was named one of Gartner's Cool Vendors in Security and Intelligence for 2015.

After receiving $5 million in Series A funding back in June 2015, Illusive Networks announced on October 20, 2015, their Series B round of $22 million by New Enterprise Associates.

In 2018, Illusive expanded its product offering beyond deception through the Attack Surface Manager solution, which continuously analyzes and removes unnecessary credentials and pathways that allow attackers to escalate privileges and move laterally. In that same year, Illusive also unveiled Attack Intelligence System, which delivers human readable on-demand telemetry about current attacker activities to speed investigation and remediation. Along with the deception solution Attack Detection System, these three solutions make up the Active Defense Suite that seeks to paralyze attackers and eradicate in-network threats. In 2020, Illusive raised another round of funding from new investors alongside existing investors, including Spring Lake Equity Partners, Marker, New Enterprise Associates, Bessemer Venture Partners, Innovation Endeavors, Cisco, Microsoft, and Citi

In 2022, Illusive expanded its product line again by introducing Identity Risk Management. The product offers visibility into the vulnerable identities sprawled across an organization's endpoints and servers, then eliminate them or deploys deception-based detection techniques as a compensating control to stop attackers.

On December 12, 2022 Proofpoint, Inc. announced that it entered into a definitive agreement to acquire Illusive in a deal expected to close in January 2023.

== Technology ==
The agentless technology produced by Illusive Networks is designed to stop cyber attacks from moving laterally inside networks, to provide early detection of cyber attackers who have penetrated a given network, and to provide forensics to threat intelligence teams and incident responders. The software blocks intruders from advancing their attacks by eliminating credentials and connections left behind by normal business processes, by providing false and misleading information that appears alongside real, valuable information, and by deploying devices and decoys to attract and distract attackers. The software is designed to thwart attacks and advanced persistent threats. Instead of targeting just malware, the Illusive software targets actual human beings (cyber attackers) who must make decisions at each step in the process in order to advance further into a network. If the attackers use the deceptive lures during the attack, network administrators will be alerted and given the option to shut the attack down immediately or observe the hacker accruing real-time breach forensics. The software has more than 50,000 users at Fortune 500 companies, healthcare companies, insurance companies, legal firms, and others.
