= Shlomo Touboul =

Israeli business executive and inventor

- שלמה טובול
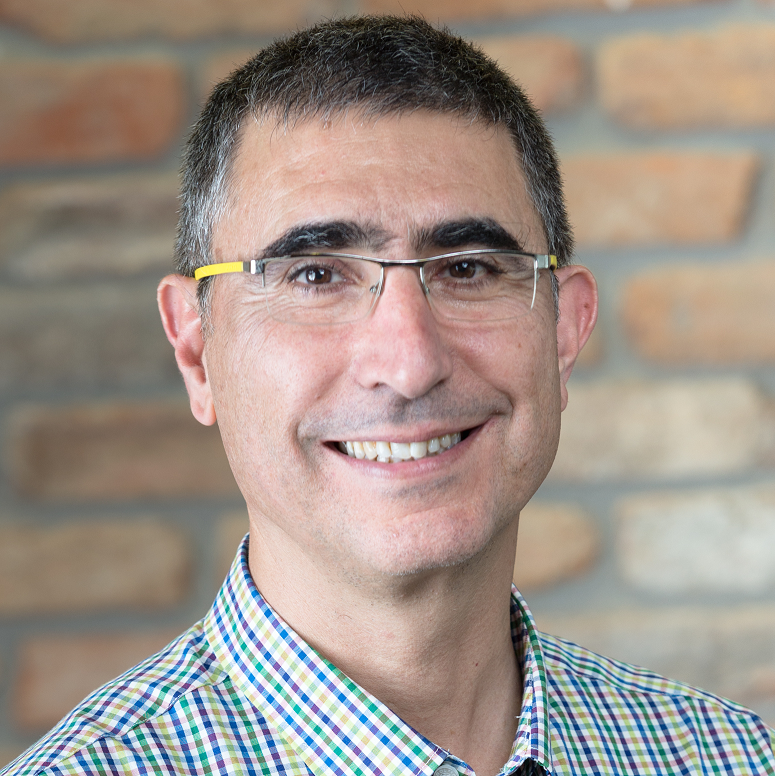
- Born: Israel
- Occupations: Business executive Inventor
- Years active: 1985-
- Known for: Founder & CEO of Shany (company); BU Manager at Intel; Founder & CEO of Runway and Runway Telecom; Founder & CEO of Finjan Software; Founder & CEO of Yoggie; CEO of Illusive Networks; Founder & CEO of AirEye; Founder & Chairman of Xeris AI
- Website: AirEye

Shlomo Touboul (Hebrew: שלמה טובול) is an Israeli business executive and inventor who has founded several companies including Finjan Software and Shany (or Shani) Computers. He is currently the President and CEO of Illusive Networks, a startup from the Israel-based incubator, Team8.

== Career ==
Touboul's career began in earnest with the founding of Shani (or Shany) Computers in 1985. The Israeli company and its California subsidiary were sold to Intel in 1994 for between $15 million and $20 million. This sale marked the first time a United States corporation had come to Israel to purchase a startup. He went on to work for Intel as a manager in their Network Management Business Unit. In 1996, he founded Finjan Software Inc. The company designed and patented antivirus software and anti-spyware software. In 1996 and 1997, the company received $18 million in investor funding.

In 2000, Touboul left Finjan to start Runway, Israel's first internet incubator, and Runway Telecom Partners, an Israeli telecommunications venture fund co-founded with Alcatel. Alcatel invested $15 million in Runway Telecom in 2001. Also in 2001, Finjan encountered financial difficulties and Touboul returned to the company at the request of investor, David Cowan of Bessemer Venture Partners. As CEO of Finjan, Touboul often spoke about the risks of advanced spyware and the security gaps in programs and programming languages like JavaScript. He also invented new technologies, including static and dynamic code behavior analysis and behavior-based blocking technology. Touboul invented over 30 patents in the domain of behavior-based Anti Malware, introducing an alternative to old signature-based Anti Malware. Touboul helped aggressively market Finjan's proactive defense technology, and McAfee incorporated that technology into their products. Touboul also pushed for more funding. Finjan secured $8.5 million in funding from an investor group led by Benchmark Capital Israel, Israel Seed Partners, and Bessemer Venture Partners. This brought the total amount of funding to $31.5 million over the course of 6 years. Touboul helped Finjan earn an additional $10 million in funding in 2004 from investors including Cisco Systems, Bessemer Venture Partners, Israel Seed Partners, and Benchmark Capital.

After licensing certain Finjan patents to Microsoft and securing an additional $10M investment, Finjan terminated Touboul in July 2005. He started Yoggie Security Systems 3 weeks after he departed from Finjan. This new company designed hardware to solve security issues for individuals using laptops or mobile devices on public and private networks. The hardware also kept security tasks separate from the computer's main CPU ("offloading"), implementing the first security-dedicated coprocessor for network-based computers and devices. Touboul invented 8 patents for Yoggie. Among the Yoggie products are the Yoggie Gatekeeper Pico and the Gatekeeper Card. Within the first year of its operation, Yoggie received $1.8 million in investment funding from investors in Silicon Valley, Israel, and New York City (including Earlybird Venture Capital). In total, Touboul helped raise around $18 million in funding for Yoggie, and the company was eventually sold to Norway-based Cupp Computing in 2011.

During 2008-2018, Touboul worked with Finjan and Finjan's holding team to license and enforce Finjan patents and secured over $400M in revenue, e.g Finjan vs. BlueCoat. Finjan patents survived the highest challenges, including at the supreme court, and are used as case studies in US law universities.

In 2014, Touboul became the CEO of Illusive Networks, a company founded by Ofer Israeli and Israeli incubator, Team8. Illusive Networks received $5 million in Series A funding from Team8, which had a capital investment of $18 million from investors like Google Chairman Eric Schmidt's Innovation Endeavor, Marker LLC, Cisco, Alcatel, Bessemer Venture Partners, and others. Touboul secured additional $22M from NEA and other investors. The company provides information security by deliberately deceiving hackers and tricking them into collecting and using false information. The software provides early detection of attacks and advanced persistent threats. Touboul held the position of CEO at the company until 2017. In 2022 Illusive was acquired by Proofpoint, a Thoma Bravo company.

In 2017, Touboul invented a family of eSticker patents for distributed eStickers management and control systems.

In 2018, Touboul founded with Roi Keren and became the CEO of AirEye (formerly WifiWall). Starting as a consumer-focused Indiegogo project, the company evolved into a corporate cybersecurity provider, protecting against over-the-air attacks. After rebranding as AirEye and the addition of Ohad Plotnik and Amichai Shulman, the company raised $8M from investors like USVP and The Stanford Fund. AirEye, known for developing Network Airspace Control and Protect (NACP) technology, holds several patents in this area. Shlomo Touboul served as CEO until August 2023, succeeded by Tanuj Mohan, with Touboul remaining as a board member. AirEye is recognized as a Gartner Cool Vendor in cybersecurity.

In 2024, Shlomo Touboul founded Spark Israel Innovation to enhance companies' innovative capabilities and transform Israel from a Startup Nation into an Innovation Nation. This initiative aims to bolster the overall innovation landscape, supporting companies in their quest to innovate and grow.

In 2025, Touboul co-founded Xeris AI with Reffael Caspi and serves as its active chairman. The company focuses on securing AI infrastructure and enabling enterprise-scale deployment of generative AI. Xeris AI was recognized in Deloitte’s "Israel’s AI Cyber Frontier" report for its contributions to AI cybersecurity innovation.

== Patents ==
- U.S. Patent US6125390A Method and appartus for monitoring and controlling programs in a network April 1994; issued Sept 2000
- U.S. Patent US6167520A System and method for protecting a client during runtime from hostile Downloadable Nov 1996; issued Dec 2000
- U.S. Patent US6154844A System and method for attaching a downloadable security profile to a Downloadable Nov 1996; issued Nov 2000
- U.S. patent 6,125,390 Method and apparatus for monitoring and controlling in a network filed August 25, 1997; issued September 26, 2000
- U.S. patent 6,480,962 System and method for protecting a client during runtime from hostile downloadables filed April 18, 2000; issued November 12, 2002
- U.S. patent 20,040,054,770 Method and apparatus for monitoring and controlling programs in a network filed July 30, 2003; issued March 18, 2004
- U.S. patent 20,040,153,515 Methods and systems for auto-marking, watermarking, auditing, reporting, tracing and policy enforcement via e-mail and networking systems filed October 7, 2003; issued August 5, 2004
- U.S. patent 6,804,780 System and method for protecting a computer and a network from hostile downloadables filed March 30, 2000; issued October 12, 2004
- U.S. Patent US8200793B2 Methods and systems for auto-marking, watermarking, auditing, reporting tracking and policy enforcement Dec 1997; issued Nov 2000
- U.S. Patent US20050005107A1 Method and system for caching at secure gateways May 2004; issued Jan 2005
- U.S. Patent US20050108554A1 Method and system for adaptive rule-based content scanners Aug 2004; issued May 2005
- U.S. Patent US20060026677A1 Malicious mobile code runtime monitoring system and methods Jan 2005; issued Feb 2006
- U.S. patent 7,418,731 Method and system for caching at secure gateways filed May 3, 2004; issued August 26, 2008
- U.S. Patent US7613926B2 Method and system for protecting a computer and a network from hostile downloadable Mar 2006; issued Nov 2009
- U.S. patent 6,965,968 Policy-based caching filed February 27, 2003; issued November 15, 2005
- U.S. patent 7,975,305 Method and system for adaptive rule-based content scanners for desktop computers filed December 9, 2004; issued July 5, 2011
- U.S. patent 20,090,249,465 System and Method for Implementing Content and Network Security Inside a Chip filed March 11, 2009; issued October 1, 2009
- U.S. Patent US8381297B2 System and method for providing network security to mobile devices March 2006; issued Feb 2013
- U.S. Patent US20080276302A1 System and Method for Providing Data and Device Security Between External and Host Device March 2008; issued Nov 2008
- U.S. patent 7,756,996 Embedding management data within HTTP messages filed January 30, 2004; issued July 13, 2010
- U.S. patent 8,627,452 System and method for providing network security to mobile devices filed January 7, 2013; issued January 7, 2014
- U.S. patent 20,150,180,885 Malicious Mobile Code Runtime Monitoring System and Methods filed February 11, 2015; issued June 25, 2015
- U.S. Patent US-10063639-B1 Sticker communication method and system filled Nov 2017; issued August 2018
- U.S. Patent US-11005961-B2 Ad-hoc low power low cost communication via a network of electronic stickers filled July 2019; issued May 2021
- U.S. Patent US US20190349334A1 WifiWall May 2019; issued Nov 2019
- U.S. Patent US-20210266374A1 Caching sticker profiles within a sticker communication system May 2021; issued Aug 2021
- U.S. Patent US20220400380A1 Maintaining continuous wireless service during policy enforcement June 2022; issued Dec 2022
- U.S. Patent US-11706650B2 Orchestration of multiple wireless sensors for monitoring a wireless spectrum March 2022; issued Jul 2023
