= Customer support =

Service to help customers use a product

Customer support is a range of services to assist customers in making cost effective and correct use of a product. It includes assistance in planning, installation, training, troubleshooting, maintenance, upgrading, and disposal of a product. Regarding technology products such as mobile phones, televisions, computers, software products or other electronic or mechanical goods, it is termed technical support. Customer support uses various channels, including telephone, email, live chat, self-service knowledge bases, and social media. Research indicates that most customers attempt to resolve issues through self-service before contacting a representative. For products sold across multiple regions, support may be provided in several languages, as consumers tend to prefer assistance in their native language. Requirements for customer contact centres are defined in international standards such as ISO 18295.

Customer support requests are frequently managed through ticketing systems, which log each customer issue as a discrete record that can be categorized, assigned, and tracked to resolution. These systems are often governed by service-level agreements (SLAs) that define target response and resolution times, with unresolved or high-priority tickets subject to escalation to more senior or specialized staff when defined thresholds are met. Research on enterprise support operations has examined how ticket categorization and escalation prediction can improve response times and resource allocation, drawing on field studies of large-scale support environments such as IBM's.

== See also ==
- Customer success
- Automation
- Customer service
- Help desk software
- Web chat
- Professional services automation
- Run Book Automation (RBA)
- Technical support
