= Network operations center =

Location from which network management is performed

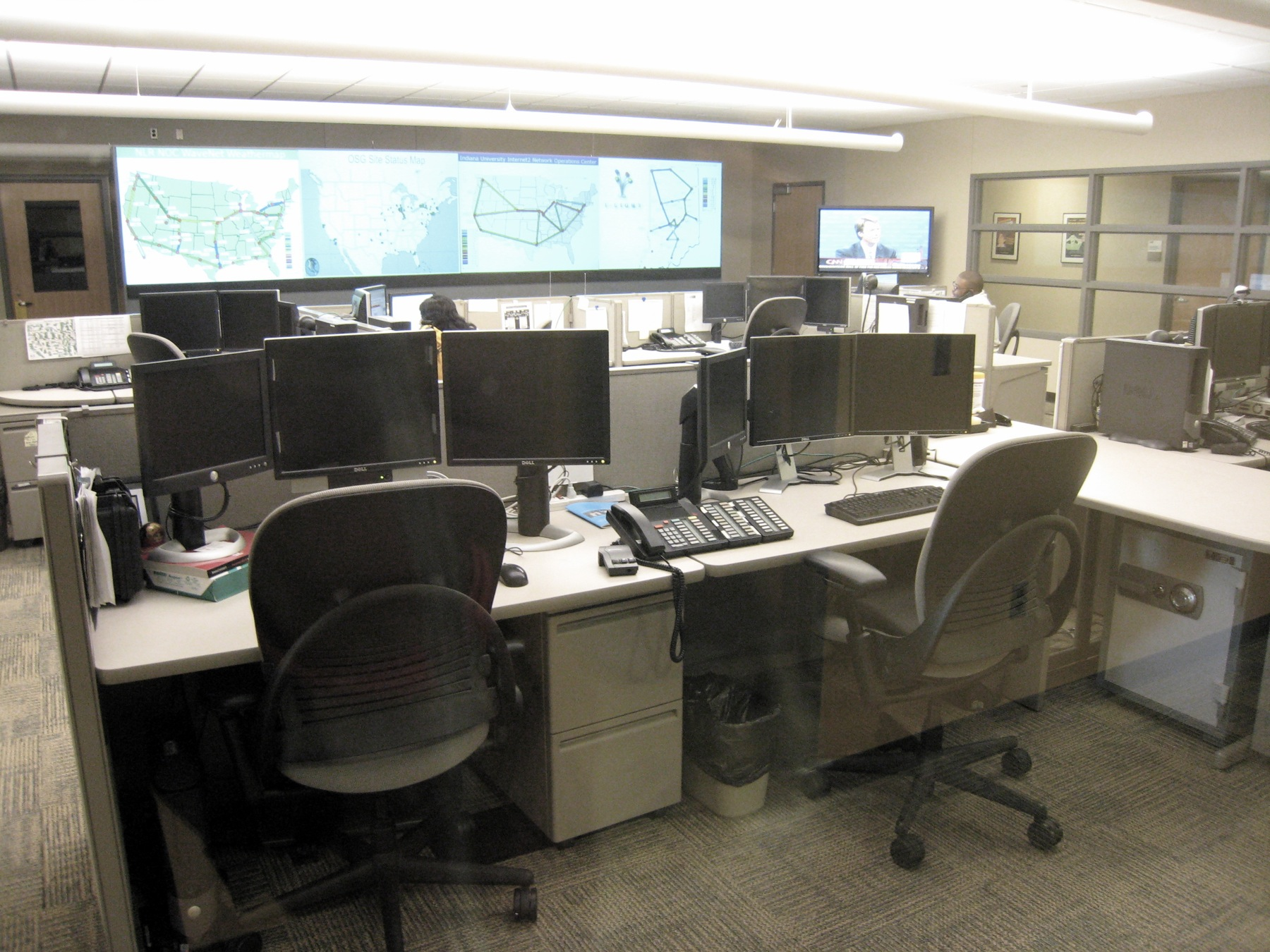
Overview of a typical NOC. Status monitors (front), backbone overview (back), and news broadcast on TV-set (right). Note the safe under the desk, typically for backups, passwords, or hardware cryptographic devices. - Picture of the Global Network Operations Center [GlobalNOC] at Indiana University

A network operations center (NOC, pronounced like the word knock), also known as a "network management center", is one or more locations from which network monitoring and control, or network management, is exercised over a computer, telecommunication or satellite network.

== History ==
The earliest NOCs started during the 1960s. A Network Control Center was opened in New York by AT&T in 1962 which used status boards to display switch and routing information, in real-time, from AT&T's most important toll switches. AT&T later replaced this Network Control Center with a modernized NOC in 1977, located in Bedminster, New Jersey.

== Purpose ==
NOCs are implemented by business organizations, public utilities, universities, and government agencies that oversee complex networking environments that require high availability. NOC personnel are responsible for monitoring one or many networks for certain conditions that may require special attention to avoid degraded service. Organizations may operate more than one NOC, either to manage different networks or to provide geographic redundancy in the event of one site becoming unavailable.

In addition to monitoring internal and external networks of related infrastructure, NOCs can monitor social networks to get a head-start on disruptive events.

== Networking environments ==
=== Computer ===
Computer environments can range in size from one to millions of servers.

=== Telecommunication ===
In telecommunication environments, NOCs are responsible for monitoring power failures, communication line alarms (such as bit errors, framing errors, line coding errors, and circuits down) and other performance issues that may affect the network, and in telecom sector have to track details about the call flow.

=== Satellite ===
Satellite network environments process large amounts of voice and video data, in addition to intelligence, surveillance and reconnaissance information. Example organizations that manage this form of NOC includes Artel, a service provider of commercial satellite bandwidth to the United States Department of Defense, located in Herndon, Virginia.

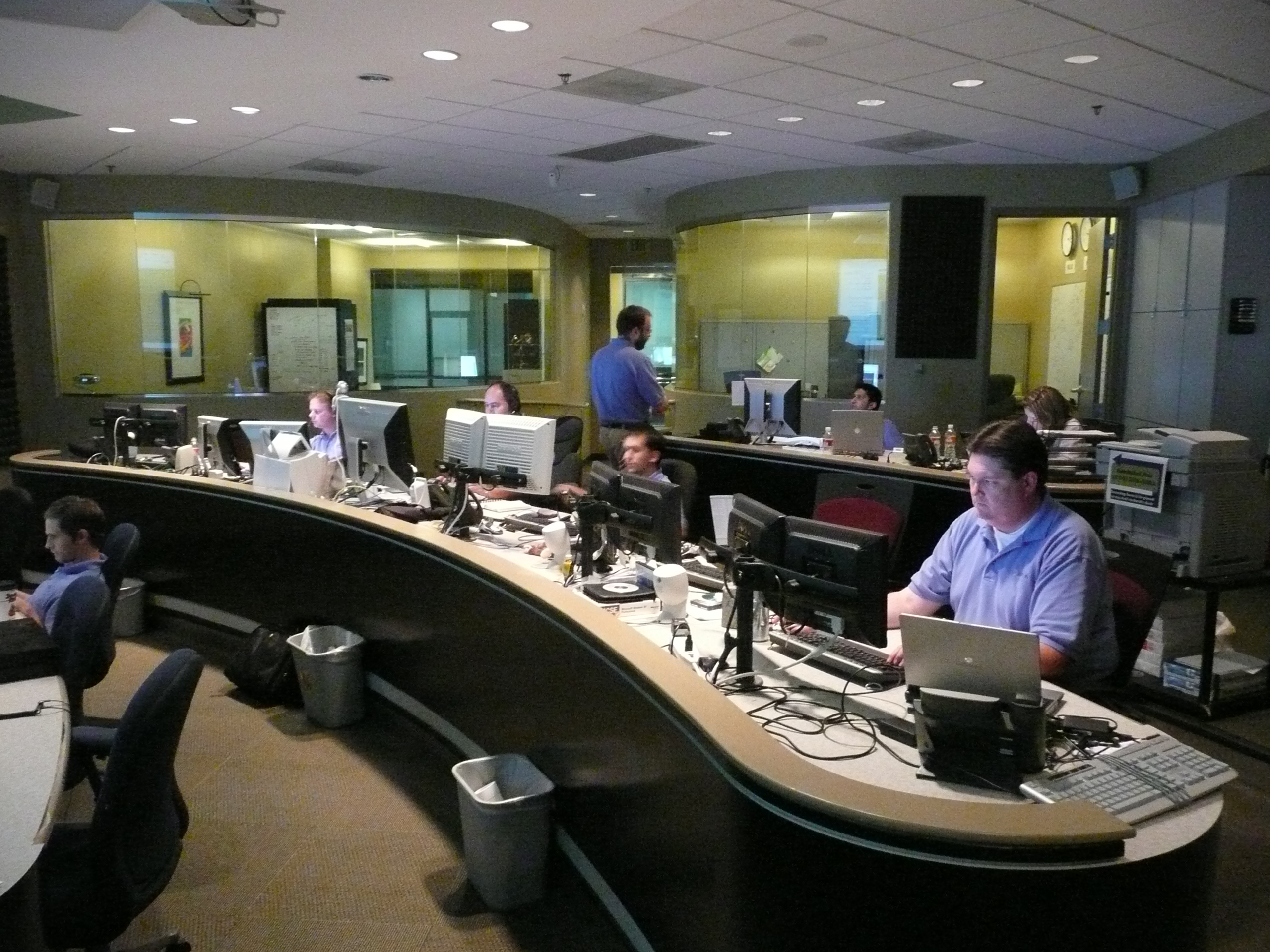
Technicians in Architel NOC

== Design ==
NOCs are frequently laid out with several rows of desks, all facing a video wall, which typically shows details of highly significant alarms, ongoing incidents and general network performance; a corner of the wall is sometimes used for showing a news or weather TV channel, as this can keep the NOC technicians aware of current events which may affect the network or systems they are responsible for. The back wall of a NOC is sometimes glazed; there may be a room attached to this wall which is used by members of the team responsible for dealing with serious incidents to meet while still able to watch events unfolding within the NOC. Individual desks are generally assigned to a specific network, technology or area. A technician may have several computer monitors on their desk, with the extra monitors used for monitoring the systems or networks covered from that desk. The location housing a NOC may also contain many or all of the primary servers and other equipment essential to running the network, although it is not uncommon for a single NOC to monitor and control a number of geographically dispersed sites.

== Personnel ==
=== NOC engineers ===
A NOC engineer has several duties in order to ensure the smooth running of the network. They deal with things such as DDoS attacks, power outages, network failures, and routing black-holes. There are of course the basic roles, such as remote hands, support, configuration of hardware (such as firewalls and routers, purchased by a client). NOC engineers also have to ensure the core network is stable. This can be done by configuring hardware in a way that makes the network more secure, but still has optimal performance. NOC engineers are also responsible for monitoring activity, such as network usage, temperatures etc. They would also have to install equipment, such as KVMs, rack installation, IP-PDU setup, running cabling. The majority of NOC engineers are also on call and have a five or six day rotation, working different shifts.

== See also ==
- Central apparatus room
- Control room
- Data center
- Data center management
- Internet exchange point
- Master control
- NetOps
- Security operations center
  - Information security operations center
