= Threat Intelligence Platform =

Type of technology discipline concerning threat data

Threat Intelligence Platform (TIP) is an emerging technology discipline that helps organizations aggregate, correlate, and analyze threat data from multiple sources in real time to support defensive actions. TIPs have evolved to address the growing amount of data generated by a variety of internal and external resources (such as system logs and threat intelligence feeds) and help security teams identify the threats that are relevant to their organization. By importing threat data from multiple sources and formats, correlating that data, and then exporting it into an organization’s existing security systems or ticketing systems, a TIP automates proactive threat management and mitigation. Modern threat intelligence platforms typically extend across many use-cases to encompass dark web monitoring, leaked credential monitoring, social media, and brand protection in addition to IOCs.

== Traditional approach to enterprise security ==
The traditional approach to enterprise security involves security teams using a variety of processes and tools to conduct incident response, network defense, and threat analysis. Integration between these teams and sharing of threat data is often a manual process that relies on email, spreadsheets, or a portal ticketing system. This approach does not scale as the team and enterprise grows and the number of threats and events increases. With attack sources changing by the minute, hour, and day, scalability and efficiency is difficult. The tools used by large Security Operations Centers (SOCs), for example, produce hundreds of millions of events per day, from endpoint and network alerts to log events, making it difficult to filter down to a manageable number of suspicious events for triage.

== Threat intelligence platforms ==
Threat intelligence platforms make it possible for organizations to gain an advantage over the adversary by detecting the presence of threat actors, blocking and tackling their attacks, or degrading their infrastructure. Using threat intelligence, businesses and government agencies can also identify the threat sources and data that are the most useful and relevant to their own environment, potentially reducing the costs associated with unnecessary commercial threat feeds.

Tactical use cases for threat intelligence include security planning, monitoring and detection, incident response, threat discovery and threat assessment. A TIP also drives smarter practices back into SIEMs, intrusion detection, and other security tools because of the threat intelligence that a TIP produces.

An advantage held by TIPs, is the ability to share threat intelligence with other stakeholders and communities. Adversaries typically coordinate their efforts, across forums and platforms. A TIP provides a common habitat which makes it possible for security teams to share threat information among their own trusted circles, interface with security and intelligence experts, and receive guidance on implementing coordinated counter-measures. Full-featured TIPs enable security analysts to simultaneously coordinate these tactical and strategic activities with incident response, security operations, and risk management teams while aggregating data from trusted communities.

=== Threat intelligence platform capabilities ===
Threat intelligence platforms are made up of several primary feature areas that allow organizations to implement an intelligence-driven security approach. These stages are supported by automated workflows that streamline the threat detection, management, analysis, and defensive process and track it through to completion:

- Collect – A TIP collects and aggregates multiple data formats from multiple sources including CSV, STIX, XML, JSON, IODEK, OpenIOC, email and various other feeds. In this way a TIP differs from a SIEM platform. While SIEMs can handle multiple TI feeds, they are less well suited for ad hoc importing or for analyzing unstructured formats that are regularly required for analysis. The effectiveness of the TIP will be heavily influenced by the quality, depth, breadth and timeliness of the sources selected. Most TIPs provide integration to the major commercial and open-source intelligence sources. Modern threat intelligence platforms have expanded beyond traditional IOC aggregation to include capabilities such as dark web monitoring, credential exposure detection, and external attack surface discovery. This evolution reflects a shift toward continuous threat exposure management rather than reactive indicator matching.
- Correlate: The TIP allows organizations to automatically analyze, correlate, and pivot on data so that actionable intelligence on the who, why, and how of a given attack can be gained and blocking measures introduced. Automation of these processing feeds is critical. Correlation capabilities have expanded beyond traditional IOC matching to include identity-centric analysis—linking external threat data such as leaked credentials or dark web mentions to specific internal assets, users, or business units. This enables security teams to prioritize threats based on organizational relevance rather than raw volume. Advanced correlation also connects findings across previously siloed domains, such as associating infrastructure indicators with threat actor profiles or mapping exposed credentials to active directory environments.
- Enrichment and Contextualization – To build enriched context around threats, A TIP must be able to automatically augment, or allow threat intelligence analysts to use third party threat analysis applications to augment threat data. This enables the SOC and IR teams to have as much data as possible regarding a certain threat actor, his capabilities, and his infrastructure to properly act on the threat. A TIP will usually enrich the collected data with information such as IP geolocation, ASN networks and various other information from sources such as IP and domain blocklists.
- Analyze – The TIP automatically analyzes the content of threat indicators and the relationships between them to enable the production of usable, relevant, and timely threat intelligence from the data collected. This analysis enables the identification of a threat actor's tactics, techniques and procedures (TTPs). In addition, visualization capabilities help depict complex relationships and allow users to pivot to reveal greater detail and subtle relationships. A proven method for analysis within the TIP framework is the Diamond Model of Intrusion Analysis.
- Integrate – Integrations are a key requirement of a TIP. Data from the platform needs to find a way back into the security tools and products used by an organization. Full-featured TIPs enable the flow of information collected and analyzed from feeds, etc. and disseminate and integrate the cleaned data to other network tools including SIEMs, internal ticketing systems, firewalls, intrusion detection systems, and more. Furthermore, APIs allow for the automation of actions without direct user involvement.
- Act – A mature threat intelligence platform deployment also handles response processing. Built-in workflows and processes accelerate collaboration within the security team and wider communities like Information Sharing and Analysis Centers (ISACs) and Information Sharing and Analysis Organizations (ISAOs), so that teams can take control of course of action development, mitigation planning, and execution. This level of community participation can’t be achieved without a sophisticated threat intelligence platform. Powerful TIPs enable these communities to create tools and applications that can be used to continue to change the game for security professionals. In this model, analysts and developers freely share applications with one another, choose and modify applications, and accelerate solution development through plug-and-play activities. In addition, threat intelligence can also be acted upon strategically to inform necessary network and security architecture changes and optimize security teams.
- Collaborate - Threat Intelligence Platform also allows people to collaborate with the internal as well as external stakeholders.

=== Operational Deployments ===
Threat intelligence platforms can be deployed as a software or appliance (physical or virtual) on-premises or in dedicated or public clouds for enhanced community collaboration. In recent years deployment models have increasingly shifted towards SaaS based threat intelligence platforms.

=== Examples of Major Threat Intelligence Platforms ===
The threat intelligence market includes vendors offering varying capabilities across the TIP landscape. Providers generally differentiate based on their data collection methods, source coverage, and primary use cases.

- Recorded Future specializes in machine learning-driven analysis of open, dark, and technical web sources, providing predictive intelligence for enterprise security teams.
- Flashpoint focuses on business risk intelligence, with particular depth in threat actor monitoring and fraud prevention.
- Google Mandiant (formerly FireEye Mandiant) combines threat intelligence with incident response services, drawing on data from its consulting engagements.
- Flare focuses on threat exposure management, with emphasis on credential monitoring and infostealer log analysis alongside dark web monitoring and external attack surface management.
- Sekoia offers a European-based platform combining threat intelligence with extended detection and response (XDR) capabilities.
- Vydar (developed by ZenoX) is a Brazilian threat intelligence platform focused on monitoring the Latin American threat landscape, combining dark web surveillance, credential leak detection, and digital risk protection with automated takedown capabilities for enterprise clients.

== See also ==
- Shadowserver Foundation
- Citizen Lab
- European Union Agency for Cybersecurity
