= CWE =

CWE may refer to:

== Sports ==
- Canberra White Eagles, a Serbian Australian supported football (soccer) club from Canberra, ACT, Australia.
- Canadian Wrestling Elite, an independent wrestling promotion in Canada
- Continental Wrestling Entertainment, an Indian wrestling promotion led by The Great Khali

== Other uses ==
- Camp War Eagle, the name of the United States Army camp located at the Northeast corner of the Baghdad slum known as Sadr City
- Cartier Wind Energy, a developer, owner and operator of wind farms in Quebec, Canada
- Central West End, St. Louis, Missouri, United States
- China International Water & Electric Corporation, a Chinese construction and engineering company
- Chinese Wand Exercise, an obscure ancient exercise system, related to the martial art Kung Fu
- Cold water extraction, the process whereby a substance is extracted from a mixture via cold water
- Collaborative working environment, supports people in their individual and cooperative work
- Common Weakness Enumeration, a software community project to create a catalog of software vulnerabilities
- Cross Westchester Expressway, a freeway north of New York City
- Crowle railway station station code
- Computational Wind Engineering
