= JVN =

JVN may refer to:

- Javanese language
- John von Neumann (1903–1957), Hungarian-American polymath
- Jonathan Van Ness (born 1987), American television personality
- Japan Vulnerability Notes, Japan's national computer security vulnerability database
