= Panacea (disambiguation) =

Panacea is the goddess of healing in Greek mythology.

Panacea may also refer to:

- Panacea (medicine), a cure-all, either physical medication or a solution to a problem
- Panacea (group), an American hip-hop duo
- Panacea, Florida, an unincorporated community in U.S.
- Panacea Biotec, an Indian pharmaceutical and health-management research company
- Panacea Society, a religious group based in Bedford, England
- The Panacea or Mathis Mootz, a German electronic musician, DJ and producer
- Panacea (butterfly), a butterfly genus in the subfamily Biblidinae
- Panacea, a character in the Asterix series by René Goscinny and Albert Uderzo
- Panacea, a section of "The Fountain of Lamneth", a song by Rush

== See also ==
- Remedy (disambiguation)
