= CBOM =

CBOM may refer to:

- Configurable BOM, a type of bills of materials
- CBOM (radio station), a radio station associated with CBO-FM
- Cryptographic bill of materials
