= Aurora OS =

Aurora OS may refer to:

- Aurora OS (Eeebuntu)
- Aurora OS (Russian mobile platform)
