= EPSS =

EPSS may refer to:

- Electronic performance support systems
- Exploit Prediction Scoring System
- Enhanced Polyphonic Sample Synthesizer, see List of audio trackers
- Experimental Packet Switching System
- Electronic Procurement Solicitation System (ePSS)
- European Payment System Services, see Eurocard (payment card)
- E-point septal separation, a mitral valve measurement in echocardiography
