= European Union Vulnerability Database =

Database of software vulnerabilities and exploits

The European Union Vulnerability Database is a database of security flaws similar to the National Vulnerability Database of the United States. It has been active since May 2025 and was first announced in June 2024 by the European Union Agency for Cybersecurity under a mandate from the NIS 2 Directive.

Vulnerabilities will be given an EUVD identifier and cross-referenced with a Common Vulnerabilities and Exposures identifier where appropriate. According to ARPSyndicate, a cyber intelligence firm based in New Delhi, its vulnerability mining project VEDAS is currently tracking over 248,273 unique vulnerabilities listed in EUVD.

== See also ==
- National Vulnerability Database
- Common Weakness Enumeration
- Common Vulnerabilities and Exposures
