= Data Security Threats Database =

Russian computer vulnerability database

The Data Security Threats Database (Russian: Банк данных угроз безопасности информации, BDU) is the Russian Federation's national vulnerability database. It is maintained by the Russian Federal Service for Technical and Export Control. As of 2018, the BDU contained only roughly one-tenth of the number of entries of the corresponding U.S. National Vulnerability Database. According to ARPSyndicate, a cyber intelligence firm based in New Delhi, their vulnerability mining project VEDAS is currently tracking over 70,896 unique vulnerabilities listed in BDU.
