= NRD Cyber Security =

Lithuanian cybersecurity company

NRD Cyber Security is a Lithuanian company that provides cybersecurity solutions, consulting, and other services.

The organization specializes in CSIRT and SOC creation, modernization and training. It has helped to establish national and sectorial CSIRTs around the world, including countries, such as Bangladesh, Egypt, Bhutan, Kosovo, Malawi and others.

NRD Cyber Security was found in 2013 to provide quality cybersecurity services to nations and organizations. In 2018 it was included in The Deloitte Technology Fast 50 in Europe list. In 2024 it was awarded the #98 place in MSSP Alert Top 250 world's managed security service providers.

The company is a member of various cybersecurity organizations, such as Forum of Incident Response and Security Teams (FIRST), The Global Forum on Cyber Expertise (GFCE), Unicrons Lt. It is a strategic partner of The Global Cyber Security Capacity Centre (GCSCC) at University of Oxford.
