= International Cybersecurity Challenge =

International Cybersecurity CTF Competition

International Cybersecurity Challenge (ICC)
- Status: Active
- Genre: CTF Competition
- Frequency: Annual
- Years active: 3–4
- Organiser: Global steering committee
- Website: icc.ecsc.eu

The International Cybersecurity Challenge is a cybersecurity competition created in 2022 and organised by a global steering committee composed of members coming from Europe (European Union Agency for Cybersecurity (ENISA)), Asia (Code Blue, Div0, BoB, Bitscore), USA (Katzcy), Canada (Cyber*Sci), Oceania (The University of Queensland), Africa (afriCC), and Latin America (ICC Latino America) for people up to the age of 25. The challenges include web and system exploitations, cryptography, reverse engineering, hardware, proposed in a jeopardy or attack-defense CTF format.

== Events ==
=== 2022 ===
The 2022 event was held in Athens, Greece between 14 and 17 June. There were 7 teams which represented 64 countries, and was won by Team Europe.

Results

Pos	Team	Final Score
1	Team Europe	12961
2	Team Asia	10724
3	Team USA	7765
4	Team Oceania	7447
5	Team Canada	3643
6	Team Latin America	1722
7	Team Africa	981

=== 2023 ===
The 2023 challenge was held in San Diego, California between 1 and 4 August. It was part of the International Cybersecurity Championship & Conference (IC3). The competition had 7 teams representing a region: Africa, Asia, Canada, Europe, Latin America, Oceania, and the United States. 65 countries in total were represented. Team Europe won again, Team Oceania came second Team Asia third.

Results

Pos	Team	Final Score	Day 1 - Jeopardy CTF	Day 2 - A/D CTF & KOTH	KOTH
1	Team Europe	15189.14	7670	51340.89	718
2	Team Oceania	13608.86	6497	48559.98	705
3	Team Asia	13032.00	5362	52370.95	372
4	Team USA	11438.10	5431	41016.64	709
5	Team Canada	9229.19	4024	35541.16	904
6	Team Latin America	4687.84	1906	18994.50	275
7	Team Africa	4012.86	2222	12228.01	237

=== 2024 ===
The 2024 challenge was held from 28 October to 1 November in Santiago, Chile. The competition featured participants from 48 countries from the regions of Africa, Asia, Canada, Europe, Latin America, Oceania and United States.

Results

Pos	Team	Overall	Jeopardy	Attack & Defence
1	Team Europe	30392	15196	6555
2	Team Asia	22270	12160	4421
3	Team Oceania	17350	5024	5351
4	Team USA	15909	7700	3623
5	Team Canada	5272	3328	994
6	Team Latin America	3280	1624	873
7	Team Africa	200	100	220

=== 2025 ===
The 2025 challenge was held between 11 and 14 November in Chiba, Japan. The competition featured participants from over 80 countries from the regions of Africa, Asia, ASEAN, Canada, Europe, Latin America, Oceania and United States.

Results

Pos	Team	Overall	Jeopardy	Attack & Defence
1	Team Europe	12956	6478	673409
2	Team Asia	9801	5036	544531
3	Team USA	8970	4914	491157
4	Team Oceania	7846	3850	486655
5	Team Canada	5853	3242	382401
6	Team ASEAN	5789	2900	403370
7	Team Latin America	5227	2083	422521
8	Team Africa	4256	2173	342681

=== 2026 ===
The 2026 International Cybersecurity Challenge was held between 18 and 21 May 2026 at Gold Coast, Queensland, Australia. The competition is organised by the University of Queensland Cyber Research Centre (UQ Cyber) and featured participants from over 65 countries from the regions of Africa, Asia, Canada, Europe, Latin America, Oceania and United States. Team Europe won the overall challenge for a fifth consecutive time, with Team USA winning the Jeopardy CTF, and Team Europe winning the overall Attack & Defense. This was also the closest competition to date, with Team Europe edging out Team USA by a mere 220 total points

Results

Pos	Team	Overall	Jeopardy	Attack & Defense
1	Team Europe	10417	4767	94890
2	Team USA	10197	5650	78069
3	Team Oceania	6221	2644	63275
4	Team Asia	6137	4105	39700
5	Team Canada	5198	2296	52981
6	LAC Cyber Team	1968	686	28272
7	AFRICC	1056	528	16764
