= Federal Service for Technical and Export Control =

Military agency of Russia

- Федеральная служба по техническому и экспортному контролю Federalnaya sluzhba po tekhnicheskomu i eksportnomu kontrolyu
- Great emblem

Department overview
- Formed: March 9, 2004
- Preceding Department: State Technical Commission under the President of the Russian Federation
- Type: military
- Jurisdiction: Government of Russia
- Headquarters: Moscow, Staraya Basmannaya st., 17
- Department executive: Vladimir Selin
- Parent Ministry: Ministry of Defence
- Key document: Decree of the President of the Russian Federation of March 9, 2004 No. 314 "On the system and structure of federal executive bodies"
- Website: fstec.ru

The Federal Service for Technical and Export Control of Russia (FSTEC of Russia / FSTEK) is a military agency of the Russian Federation, under the Russian Ministry of Defence. It licenses the export of weapons and dual-use technology items, and is also responsible for Russian military information security.

FSTEC of Russia maintains the Data Security Threats Database, Russia's national vulnerability database. and requires Western technology companies to submit source code and other trade secrets before allowing their products to be imported into Russia. FSTEC also liaises with the FSB, which controls cryptography in Russia.

In 2019, FSTEC of Russia granted Astra Linux special status regarding its use in processing Russian classified information.
