= EU-CyCLONe =

EU-CyCLONe or European Cyber Crisis Liaison Organisation Network is a cooperation network for European Union members to national authorities in charge of cyber crisis management. It was set up as part of the NIS 2 Directive.

It was launched in 2020 and formalised in January 2023. The chair rotates with the Presidency of the Council of the European Union.

EU-CyCLONe will submit a report assessing its work to the EU Parliament and Council of the European Union every 18 months, starting 17 October 2024.

== Blue OLEx ==
The Blueprint Operational Level Exercise is an annual exercise involving senior cybersecurity officials from EU member states and the European Commission, with European Union support. In 2024 it was hosted in Rome by Agenzia per la Cybersicurezza Nazionale, focused on executive level cooperation, particularly via EU-CyCLONe.
