= Aurora OS (Russian mobile platform) =

Russian Linux based mobile operating system

Aurora OS is a closed-source, proprietary Russian mobile operating system, developed on the basis of Sailfish OS. It is used primarily in corporate fleets of devices and government agencies, though it is also available for purchase by individual users. The system includes centralized device management, data encryption, and multi-factor authentication functions. Aurora is certified by the Federal Service for Technical and Export Control of Russia. As of 2025, the latest version of the system is Aurora 5.1.2, released in May 2024.

Notably, Aurora OS is included in the Unified Register of Russian Computer Programs and Databases.

== History of development ==
The OS has been developed since 2016 by the Russian company Open Mobile Platform based on a Sailfish OS fork (since 2012 it has been developed by the Finnish Jolla), which has been heavily modified at the level of all layers of the operating system.

In December 2020, a new release of the Aurora mobile OS was released — version 3.2 Penza.

In 2021, it received a positive FSB opinion on the compliance of the OS with the integrated software SCSI Pathfinder SL with the requirements for SCSI classes AK2 and KS2. It is certified by the FSTEC of Russia according to A4/UD4. The availability of these certificates allows the Aurora OS to be used in any IS — from the highest government authorities (the Presidential Administration and the Government of the Russian Federation) to strictly regulated in the plan IB — GIS, ISPDn, automated process control system, CII.

On 18 January 2021, it became known that it was proposed to allocate 19.4 billion rubles from the Russian state budget for the purchase of 700,000 tablets running on the Russian Aurora operating system for doctors and teachers, as well as the development of applications for it.

On 30 November 2021, a new release of Aurora 4.0 OS was released (containing 300 improvements, of which more than 40 are considered major innovations).

In 2022, the losses of the Open Mobile Platform company, which is the developer of the Aurora operating system, amounted to more than 1 billion rubles.

The Ministry of Industry and Trade recommended that domestic manufacturers of smartphones and tablets develop a plan to port Aurora OS to their devices and start selling devices in the consumer segment.

On 7 November 2023, devices with Aurora OS version 4.0.2 manufactured by the Russian company Fplus retailed for the first time since 2017, when the NOIR 7 device went on sale.

In December 2023, Aurora 5.0 was presented as part of the Rostelecom Tech Day event. The main changes affected the interface, which became closer to its foreign counterparts.

By early March 2024, according to the company Fplus, 800 smartphones and 130 tablets running on the Aurora operating system were sold.

On 9 October 2024, WMD announced the Aurora+ program, which plans to deploy the operating system on various devices, including TVs, routers, and car electronics.

In April 2025, a prototype version of the operating system for laptops and PCs was presented.

On 2 June 2025, the Aurora OS version for the car was presented at the CIPR conference On 20 June 2025, Rostelecom, AvtoVAZ and SBER signed a memorandum at the SPIEF. about the refinement and implementation of Aurora Auto in LADA cars.

== Mobile OS Features ==
- Trusted boot and integrity control of the bootloader and file system
- Built-in verification of installation and launch of programs
- Built-in security policies
- Full remote control over all smartphone functions
- Protection of communication channels (GOST VPN)
- Multi-factor authentication (including token support)
- Data encryption
- Working with electronic signatures (including qualified ones)

Centralized management of the mobile device fleet and the mobile software used is provided by the Aurora Center (AC) EMM platform developed by the Open Mobile Platform company. Aurora Center manages smartphones and tablets running on Android and Aurora OS and provides Android device management without requiring infrastructure from Google. Aurora Center is certified by the FSTEC.

Loading Aurora OS is supplemented by Aurora SDZ, a trusted boot tool for ARM processors with the root of trust in the chip itself. Aurora SDZ has integrated the trusted Aurora VAM runtime environment, which ensures the security of devices after boot.

Aurora OS has an SDK and API that allow developers to create compatible applications for the operating system.

== Device Management Platform ==
Starting with the Aurora 3.0 OS version, it is possible to remotely control and configure devices using the Aurora Center device management platform.

Released on 21 March 2023, the Aurora Center mobile device management platform version 3.2 improved conditions for corporate users and made migration from other, foreign solutions easier.

Aurora Center is included in the Unified Register of Russian Software and is certified by the FSTEC of Russia (Requirements for the 4th level of trust — UD4).

The main features of the Aurora Center:

- Integration with the LDAP directory Management of user certificates. You can prohibit or allow the use of Bluetooth, cameras, outgoing calls, date and time changes, switching the device to airplane mode, and taking screenshots. Push service for Android, which allows you to opt out of using Google's external push service Support Android 9-11 Lifecycle management of enterprise applications; installation, updating and removal of applications Updating and version control of Aurora OS on devices Online management mode — for example, blocking devices, deleting data from them on request Diagnostics and auditing of events from devices, actions of operators, application of policies, receipt of a log from devices Inventory and monitoring of device status and user actions You can also use the MDM solution Safe Mobile 5.0 (NII SOCB) to manage mobile devices based on the Aurora 4 OS.

== Applications ==
=== Embedded Applications ===
The full list of applications is available on Каталог приложений для ОС Аврора

=== Available third-party applications ===
- Antiviruses (Kaspersky Lab and Dr.Web).
- Cryptoproviders (КриптоПро и СледопытSSL).
- VPN clients (for example, ViPNet Client).
- VPN solutions for effective protection of communication channels (for example, Continent AP).
- Trusted messengers (for example «PostLink»).
- A platform for data integration and synchronization.
- Office packages (МойОфис и P7-Офис).
- Electronic Document Management Systems (EDMS).
- Personnel management systems.
- Trusted storage, including cloud storage.
- Navigation applications.
- Recognition systems (documents, bank cards, and car license plates).
- Professional radio communication systems.
- Applications for monitoring technical inspections.
- A print management application.
- A Telegram client named Tavro.

== Devices with the Aurora OS pre-installed ==
- Tablets:
  - Aquarius CMP NS220 v5.2;
  - БайтЭрг МВК-2020;
  - Aquarius Cmp NS208;
  - Fplus Pro LifeTab Plus;
  - Aquarius CMP NS220.
  - Yadro Kvadra_T
  - Fplus T800;
  - Fplus T1100;
- Smartphones:
  - Qtech QMP-M1-N;
  - Qtech QMP-M1-N IP68;
  - Масштаб TrustPhone Т1;
  - Fplus Pro R570E.
- Personal Digital Assistant,
  - Aquarius NS M11;
  - Aquarius NS M12.

== Awards ==
- Winner of the Priority 2020 Award in the Information Technology nomination.
- Winner of the "Secure Information Environment" award in the "Domestic Secure Software Product" nomination in 2020.
- Winner of the HR Brand 2020 Award for the project Project: "Open Source Communities as a recruitment tool".
- Winner of the Priority 2022 award in the Information Technology nomination for the Aurora Center mobile device management platform.

== Real-world applications ==
- 360 000 Aquarius and Bayterg tablets on the Aurora OS were used in the 2021 All-Russian Population Census. In February 2022, it became known that the Ministry would transfer the tablets used during the All-Russian Population Census to other government agencies by September 1.
- In PJSC Rostelecom, within the framework of the federal project "Infrastructure Operator for operators — O2O", more than a thousand corporate mobile workplaces have been created on the Aurora OS, which remotely assign and monitor the execution of orders, provide photo recording and accounting of completed work in automatic mode. The next stage of the project's development is planned for 2021. Inter RAO — Electric Generation JSC has completed the implementation of Mobile Crawler AIS at 22 power plants, developed by OMP partner SIGMA, the mobile part of which is based on Aurora OS. Russian Post JSC has 15,000 postmen's workstations equipped with mobile postal and cash terminals based on the Aurora OS with a pre-installed payment application, which are centrally managed by the Aurora Center. Transset, together with CORUS Consulting, has developed an Aurora mobile application for repair and restoration teams at the Russian Railways Central Communications Station. In 2021, the implementation volume will amount to 3,600 mobile workplaces equipped with a functional application and a Russian OS, with the prospect of replication for all operational personnel.

== Sales ==
In March 2024, representatives of Fplus reported that in 4 months from the start of retail sales, 800 smartphones and 130 tablets based on the Aurora operating system were sold.
