= European Cybersecurity Challenge =

European Cybersecurity CTF Competition

European Cybersecurity Challenge (ECSC)
- Status: Active
- Genre: CTF Competition
- Frequency: Annual
- Venue: Varies (within Europe)
- Location: Europe
- Years active: 12
- Inaugurated: 3 November 2014
- Previous event: 12–16 October 2026
- Next event: 2027
- Organiser: ENISA
- Website: ecsc.eu

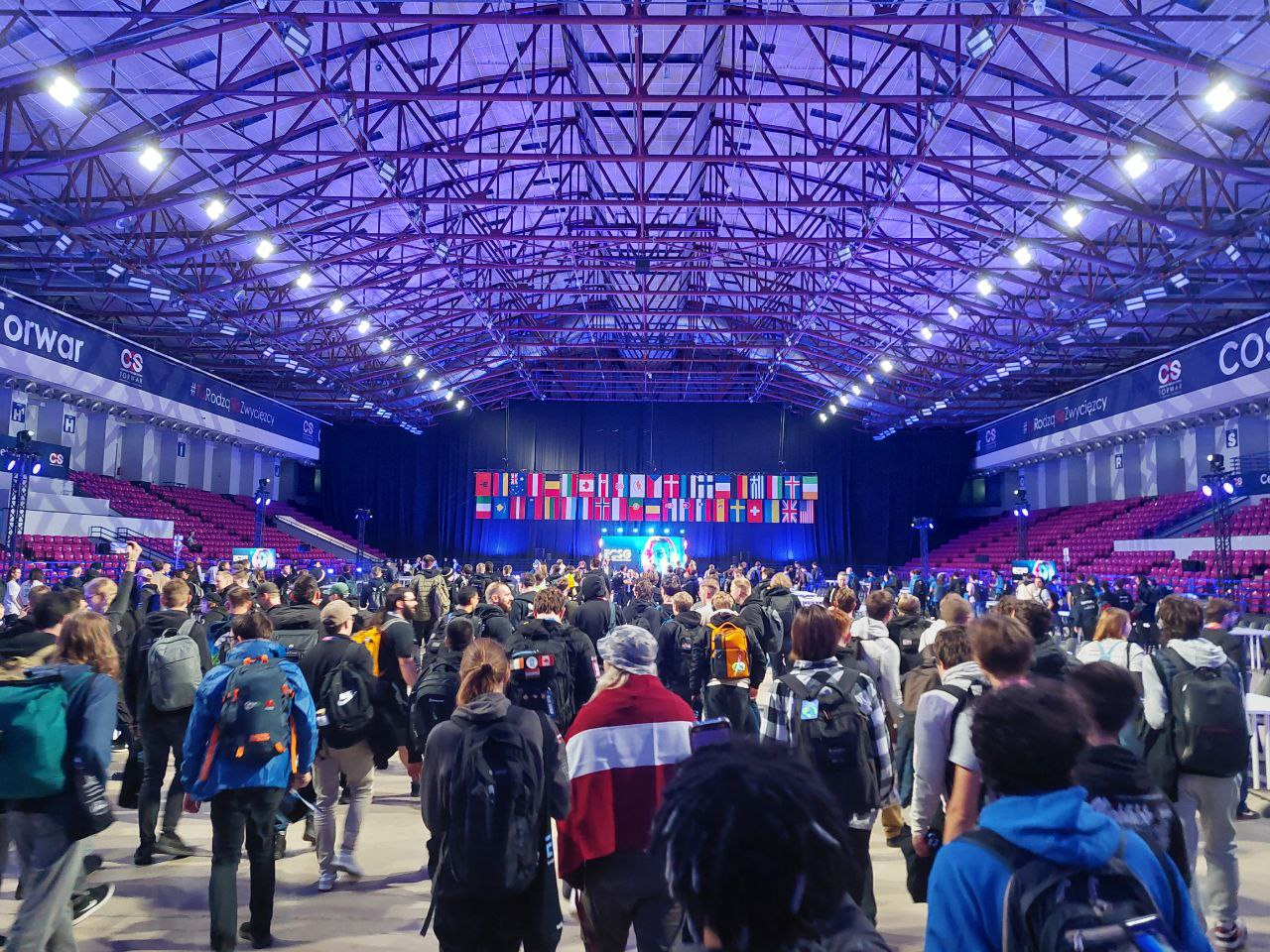
Cybersecurity Challenge 2025, Arena COS Torwar, Warsaw, Poland

The European Cybersecurity Challenge (ECSC) is an annual cybersecurity competition organized by the European Union Agency for Cybersecurity (ENISA). The event aims to foster young talent in the field of cybersecurity by bringing together teams of young individuals from various European countries to compete in solving cybersecurity-related challenges. The challenge days are usually split between the two popular CTF formats: jeopardy and attack-defense. Teams consist of at most 10 players under the age of 25, at most 5 of them over the age of 20. Each country runs national qualifiers and competitions as part of the selection process. It has been described as "the Eurovision of cybersecurity".

Previous Events
Year	Number of Official Teams	Location	Winner
2014	3	Fürstenfeld, Austria	?
2015	6	Lucerne, Switzerland	Austria
2016	10	Düsseldorf, Germany	Spain
2017	15	Málaga, Spain	Spain
2018	17	London, United Kingdom	Germany
2019	20	Bucharest, Romania	Romania
2021	19	Prague, Czech Republic	Germany
2022	28	Vienna, Austria	Denmark
2023	28	Hamar, Norway	Germany
2024	31	Turin, Italy	Germany
2025	34	Warsaw, Poland	Italy
2026	35	Bochum, Germany	Sweden
