= Chinese Wand Exercise =

Exercise system related to Kung Fu

Chinese Wand Exercise 竹棒運動
- Also known as: Chinese Wand
- Focus: martial arts
- Country of origin: China

Chinese Wand (Jiangan) Exercise or Chinese Health Wand is an obscure ancient exercise system, related to the martial art Kung Fu. The "wand" in Chinese Wand Exercise is a dowel 48–50 inches (120–130 cm) long, 1 inch (2.5 cm) in diameter, made of wood or bamboo or similar materials, used as a fulcrum for balance, form and posture. "It's the pyramid effect, with you as center." "Seventeen gentle bending, twisting and lunging movements flow in exact order, specially designed to get the blood circulating more efficiently throughout the body. These exercises are done in gradual, easy 'Stages' while using an original Chinese deep-breathing technique" and chi energy, and can be easy or more challenging as the individual chooses.

Together they exercise every major muscle in the body and take no more than 20 minutes to complete. The relative ease of the 17 moves (11 standing and six floor exercises) engage all the organs and muscles of the body together in harmony rather than separating out one part of the body from another. This produces a more efficient way of staying fit and healthy by increasing and balancing the chi energy.

"Chinese Wand prevents illness and delays the aging process of many cells." Together, they exercise the entire body safely and gently. Chinese Wand was known as a "preventive" of disease while acupuncture was the "treatment."

== History in China ==
Although awareness of its existence is recent, Chinese Wand is said to be thousands of years old. It was passed down through Grand Masters and kept private for the use of the succeeding Chinese rulers and their families. They were devised for the emperor to slow down the aging process and maintain perfect health.

The exercises were derived from studying animals at play in nature, hence some of the names of the forms: "Springing of the Tiger," "Raising of the Bird's Wing," "Panda Rolls," to name a few. Chinese wand is not by itself taught as a method of self-defense.

The source of all current information stems from Bruce L. Johnson, who is currently the only known living Grand Master of Chinese Wand.

== Coming to America ==
According to Johnson, when he was 19 he learned the exercises from 93-year-old Grand Master Ch'eng in 1945. He and two Navy buddies, all wrestlers, were exploring Shanghai and were amazed by an 80-year-old rickshaw man's ability to pull a wide rickshaw with the three muscular seamen up and down the steep hills of Shanghai. Johnson pursued the slight Chinese man who eventually led him to the slender, regal Grand Master. Upon meeting Dr. Ch'eng at his home in Shanghai, the tall, 235-pound 19-year-old was unable to take down the 130 lb. Ch'eng who, seemingly inexplicably, fended him off and left him lying on the floor after each of three increasingly aggressive advances. He used an ancient "spinning" technique. Johnson, convinced that he had to learn everything this man could teach, was soon accepted as a student by Ch'eng, who was no doubt impressed and amused by the young headstrong man's potential and enthusiasm for learning all he could. Eventually Dr. Ch'eng, having lost his sons in the war between China and Japan, trusted Johnson enough to pass on the knowledge and techniques he would need to become the next Grand Master.

== Biography of Grand Master Bruce L. Johnson ==
Minnesota-raised Bruce Leroy Johnson, (June 21, 1926 – December 11, 2014) was a sickly child who overcame his early beginnings through exercise and body-building. Health and physical fitness became a lifelong passion, as well as a quest to stay young and embrace Nature.

After high school, during World War II, the handsome blue-eyed, black-haired (of Swedish and Iroquois descent) Johnson became a Navy heavyweight wrestling champion who excelled in physical exploits and competitions. He also was a navy ranger, and one of the first to reach the shores of Iwo Jima. His mother's sister was married to revered World War II journalist and author, Ernie Pyle, with whom Bruce had a close relationship and who was killed only a few miles from where Johnson was, on the island of Ie Shima. He is often called upon to accept memorial awards on behalf of his uncle.

Johnson studied at the Kodokan Institute in Tokyo, Japan where he earned three black belts in Judo.

Back in the states after World War II, Johnson tried to introduce the merits of the exercise system. But because of McCarthyism and the fear of Communism, there was little enthusiasm about anything Asian. Few showed interest in learning the unusual, oriental exercises.

Meanwhile, wanderlust led Johnson around the world finding work, often on ships. He was a bodyguard for King Farouk for a time. Wherever he went in the world, he sought out others who might have heard of Chinese Wand, even placing ads in local papers. But he never found anyone. As far as he knew, he was the only one who knew about it. Johnson spent time in Hollywood and found a small group of health food and fitness enthusiasts such as Mae West, Jimmy Durante, and others who became students. It has been rumored that he might have been the inspiration for the song "Nature Boy" (popularized by Nat King Cole) when he claimed he spent time with the songwriter, Eden Ahbez. Later, he taught celebrities such as James Coburn who was photographed in People Magazine doing the exercises.

Johnson became friends with Bruce Lee, and the two did demonstrations of strength and speed together. "Bruce [Lee] was the only man who could ever 'handle' me – of course, he never knew Dr. Cheng." Lee was quoted in Johnson's book as saying, "All things are possible with the great Masters."

In 1965, Johnson became a hero when he rescued three children from a shark in the Bahamas by swimming out and averting its attention . A fourth child was killed. Armed with only a pointed shell he grabbed on the beach, he fought the beast a full five minutes underwater, his leg in its mouth until he jabbed its eye with the shell and was able to escape, barely making it to shore. He won international acclaim and was honored by heads of three governments.

He caused another sensation in 1966 when he and a friend (who later became his wife) volunteered to spend an unspecified amount of time on an uninhabited Fiji Island with no supplies, only bathing suits and camera equipment. Learning too late that the island was far from idyllic limited their stay to 40 days, but caused national publicity.

Dramatic adventures seemed to follow the elusive Johnson who often found himself at the right place in time to rescue others from extreme danger (over 50 documented at the risk of his own life) including fires, mangled cars, even abusive husbands.

Johnson rarely spoke of his powers as a mystic. Students would sometimes notice supernatural transformations in his appearance as he taught the class. He was inclined to believe that Dr. Ch'eng was teaching through him. One famous psychic of his day, Peter Hurkos, upon meeting Johnson said, "Who is that beautiful Chinese man coming out of you?"

Others saw Johnson transform: after a class in Eureka, California, a young student "asked him if he knew that he had become transformed into a Chinese person while he was performing the wand exercises ... Did you see it too?..." another classmate added.

Enthusiasm for Chinese Wand was minimal until a nationwide curiosity in Eastern philosophy erupted in the 1960s, beginning with the Beatles' trip to India and the subsequent publicity. Interest in meditation techniques, yoga, martial arts, and other esoteric practices spiked. At last, Johnson was able to develop classes. Eventually, he self-published a book in 1975.

In December 1976, Johnson, who also worked as a professional diver, was seriously injured in an underwater accident and sustained a near-fatal brain stem infarct causing stroke-like symptoms. Initially told he would never walk again, he once again defied odds and within a matter of months, was walking and looking as healthy as ever.

Although still reeling from lingering and painful after-effects of the trauma, he managed to generate interest from a major publisher (William Morrow, New York) who published his book in hardcover in 1977.

During the time he was striving to regain his health, he underwent a Christian "born-again" experience that eventually influenced his thinking and upended his belief system. He slowly rejected a holistic awareness of consciousness and abandoned his lifelong allegiance to preserving and re-introducing the teachings of Dr. Ch'eng and the art of Chinese Wand. The spreading of a popular desire to learn the more violent aspects of martial arts and the potential "danger" of involvement with the supernatural conflicted with his newfound ultra-conservative Christian views. Efforts to promote Chinese Wand diminished and eventually disappeared from public view.

"--Oriental philosophy is at their [martial arts] heart," Johnson says. "These things are not from God, as God is not in the business of mystical energies or the occult ... I no longer practice the martial arts ... as a Christian, I cannot in good conscience, teach or recommend the martial arts to others."

== Chinese Wand Today ==
Even though Johnson's book is no longer in print, the web and YouTube videos are generating a resurgence of the practice in the U.S. and the U.K. in particular. A new generation of students are learning what they can from Johnson's book, sometimes by changing the name slightly (e.g. 'Chi Stix', 'Stick Yoga,' or 'Jian Gan – Chinese Health Wand') to avoid copyright infringement on Johnson's original text.

It appears that Johnson did not train anyone to carry on this unique art as the next Grand Master. Because of this, apart from the basic exercises, the remaining 190 exercises, more esoteric practices and knowledge, are probably lost.

"I am the last of the Grand Masters [of Chinese Wand]. When I go, the secret goes with me."

== The Future ==
Although Johnson is the last Grand Master his book opened the art up to the wider population. He wanted his book to be in every nursing home, every hospital, every physical therapy room, every doctor's office for the doctor to prescribe the exercises to patients – in every home so families could practice together; he also hoped that workers in offices and factories could practice the exercises together to increase productivity and health of workforce and that physical fitness instructors in schools and colleges would adopt the system.

Some in the Chinese martial arts and Qigong community are now taking a serious interest in the Chinese Wand and promoting its use as a social exercise the way Johnson envisaged. A new book on the subject examines the esoteric aspects of the art and its origins and influences – and encourages dialogue within China itself. The link with China was very much in Johnson's thoughts. He was curious whether someone was still practicing in a remote region of China and intended to take the art back to China himself: "In China they now do Tai Chi, but my one ambition is to return there and bring their ancient Chinese exercises full circle."

== Similar tools ==
Tai Chi Ruler and Tai Chi Bang (Stick) are similar tools that are used in Tai Chi. The Ruler and Bang Stick are considered a Yin and Yang pair. The Bang Stick is Yang. It works more on the external joints, ligaments, and muscles. The Ruler is Yin, and works on the internal. The Ruler is light, while the Bang Stick is heavy. The Bang Stick is straight, about the length of the forearm and diameter of the wrist. The Ruler is typically about 12" long with a contoured diameter largest at its ends. Both the Bang Stick and Ruler have a unique feature – a ring on the Bang Stick and a small sphere on the Ruler. There are adaptations of those tools: the Long Bang (Tai Chidu), a two-person version of the Bang and the Bent Bang.

Taiji Zhang (杖 (zhang) lit. wand meaning cane, stick or rod) or Tai Chi Stick is another more similar tool. Used in Taiji Stick Health Preservation Exercises (Taiji Yang Sheng Zhang (太極養生杖): 太极 (Taiji), 养生 (Yangsheng "nourish life") created by Chinese Health Qigong Association in 2007.
