= Open Source Vulnerability Database =

The Open Sourced Vulnerability Database (OSVDB) was an independent and open-sourced vulnerability database. The goal of the project was to provide accurate, detailed, current, and unbiased technical information on security vulnerabilities. The project promoted greater and more open collaboration between companies and individuals. The database's motto was "Everything is Vulnerable".

The core of OSVDB was a relational database which tied various information about security vulnerabilities into a common, cross-referenced open security data source. As of December 2013, the database cataloged over 100,000 vulnerabilities. While the database was maintained by a 501(c)(3) non-profit public organization and volunteers, the data was prohibited for commercial use without a license. Despite that, many large commercial companies used the data in violation of the license without contributing employee volunteer time or financial compensation.

== History ==
The project was started in August 2002 at the Blackhat and DEF CON Conferences by several industry notables (including H. D. Moore, rain.forest.puppy, and others). Under mostly-new management, the database officially launched to the public on March 31, 2004. The original implementation was written in PHP by Forrest Rae (FBR). Later, the entire site was re-written in Ruby on Rails by David Shettler.

The Open Security Foundation (OSF) was created to ensure the project's continuing support. Jake Kouns (Zel), Chris Sullo, Kelly Todd (AKA Lyger), David Shettler (AKA D2D), and Brian Martin (AKA Jericho) were project leaders for the OSVDB project, and held leadership roles in the OSF at various times.

On 5 April 2016, the database was shut down, while the blog was initially continued by Brian Martin. The reason for the shut down was the ongoing commercial but uncompensated use by security companies.

As of January 2012, vulnerability entry was performed by full-time employees of Risk Based Security, who provided the personnel to do the work in order to give back to the community. Every new entry included a full title, disclosure timeline, description, solution (if known), classification metadata, references, products, and researcher who discovered the vulnerability (creditee).

== Process ==
Originally, vulnerability disclosures posted in various security lists and web sites were entered into the database as a new entry in the New Data Mangler (NDM) queue. The new entry contained only a title and links to the disclosure. At that stage the page for the new entry didn't contain any detailed description of the vulnerability or any associated metadata. As time permitted, new entries were analyzed and refined, by adding a description of the vulnerability as well as a solution if available. This general activity was called "data mangling" and someone who performed this task a "mangler". Mangling was done by core or casual volunteers. Details submitted by volunteers were reviewed by the core volunteers, called "moderators", further refining the entry or rejecting the volunteer changes if necessary. New information added to an entry that was approved was then available to anyone browsing the site.

== Contributors ==
Some of the key people that volunteered and maintained OSVDB:

- Jake Kouns (Officer of OSF, Moderator)
- Brian Martin a.k.a. Jericho (Officer of OSF, Moderator)
- Kelly Todd a.k.a. Lyger (Officer of OSF, Moderator)
- David Shettler (Officer of OSF, Developer)
- Chris Sullo (Officer of OSF, Moderator)
- Daniel Moeller (Moderator)
- Forrest Rae (Developer)

Other volunteers who have helped in the past include:

- Steve Tornio (Moderator)
- Zach Shue (Moderator)
- Alexander Koren a.k.a. ph0enix (Mangler)
- Carsten Eiram a.k.a. Chep (Moderator)
- Marlowe (Mangler)
- Travis Schack (Mangler)
- Susam Pal (Mangler)
- Christian Seifert (Mangler)
- Zain Memon
