= Open Security Foundation =

Defunct non-profit security organization

The Open Security Foundation (OSF) was a 501(c)(3) non-profit public organization "founded and operated by information security enthusiasts". The OSF managed several projects including the Open Source Vulnerability Database (OSVDB), Data Loss Database (DatalossDB), and Cloutage.

The OSF was established in 2005 to function as a support organization for open source security projects. It was originally conceived and founded to support the OSVDB project, but its scope evolved to provide support for numerous other projects.

The foundation allows organizations and individuals to provide charitable contributions to support open source security projects that provide value to the global community. The foundation also provided guidance, legal, administrative, policy guidelines, and other support to numerous projects.

The Open Security Foundation was conceived by Chris Sullo, Jake Kouns, and Brian Martin in early 2004, and obtained official US 501(c)3 non-profit status in April, 2005 (EIN: 20-1178497). In 2014 it reported $6,000 in total revenue and $7,750 in total assets.

In 2011, OSF partnered with Risk Based Security to receive commercial support for two of their projects, OSVDB and DatalossDB. The OSVDB project announced it was finished on April 5, 2016.

== See also ==
- Open Source Security Foundation
