= Common Vulnerabilities and Exposures =

Catalog of information security problems

CVE: Common Vulnerabilities and Exposures
- Logo as of 2024
- Website type: Cybersecurity
- Available in: English
- Creator: Mitre Corporation
- Website: https://www.cve.org/
- Launched: September 1999

The Common Vulnerabilities and Exposures (CVE) system, originally Common Vulnerability Enumeration, provides a reference method for publicly known information-security vulnerabilities and exposures. The United States' Homeland Security Systems Engineering and Development Institute FFRDC, operated by The MITRE Corporation, maintains the system, with funding from the US National Cyber Security Division of the US Department of Homeland Security. The system was officially launched for the public in September 1999.

The Security Content Automation Protocol uses CVE, and CVE IDs are listed on MITRE's system are the basis for the US National Vulnerability Database.

== CVE identifiers ==
MITRE Corporation's documentation defines CVE Identifiers (also called "CVE names", "CVE numbers", "CVE-IDs", and "CVEs") as unique, common identifiers for publicly known information-security vulnerabilities in publicly released software packages. Historically, CVE identifiers originally had a status of "candidate" ("CAN-") and could then be promoted to entries ("CVE-"), but this practice was ended in 2005 and all identifiers are now assigned as CVEs. Each CVE entry begins as a reserved CVE. If it is accepted as a security vulnerability, it is published as an official CVE entry (e.g., a CVE may be improperly assigned to an issue which is not a security vulnerability, or which duplicates an existing entry). If found not to meet criteria, MITRE or a CVE Numbering Authority (CNA) can summarily place the entry into rejected status.

CVEs are assigned by a CVE Numbering Authority (CNA). While some vendors acted as a CNA before, the name and designation was not created until 1 February 2005. There are four primary types of CVE number assignments:

1. The MITRE Corporation functions as Editor and Primary CNA
2. Various CNAs assign CVE numbers for their own products (e.g., Microsoft, Oracle, HP, Red Hat)
3. A third-party coordinator such as CERT Coordination Center may assign CVE numbers for products not covered by other CNAs
4. Researchers, in one case, have been granted the CNA role.

When investigating a vulnerability or potential vulnerability it helps to acquire a CVE number early on. CVE numbers may not appear in the MITRE or NVD databases for some time (days, weeks, months or potentially years) due to issues that are embargoed (the CVE number has been assigned but the issue has not been made public), or historically in cases where the entry is not researched and written up by MITRE due to resource issues. The benefit of early CVE candidacy is that all future correspondence and coordination can refer to the CVE number to ensure all parties are referring to the same vulnerability. Information on getting CVE identifiers for issues with open source projects is available from Red Hat and GitHub.

CVEs are for software that has been publicly released; this can include betas and other pre-release versions if they are widely used. Commercial software is included in the "publicly released" category, but custom-built software that is not distributed would historically not be given a CVE. For the first two decades of the program, services (e.g., a Web-based email provider) are not assigned CVEs for vulnerabilities found in the service (e.g., an XSS vulnerability) unless the issue exists in an underlying software product that is publicly distributed. Official rules have not been published regarding this change but some CNAs including MITRE have begun assigning CVEs to service-based vulnerabilities as far back as 2000.

== CVE data fields ==
The CVE database contains several fields:

=== Description ===
This is a standardized text description of the issue(s). One common entry is:

** RESERVED ** This candidate has been reserved by an organization or individual that will use it when announcing a new security problem. When the candidate has been publicized, the details for this candidate will be provided.

This means that the entry number has been reserved by Mitre for an issue or a CNA has reserved the number. So when a CNA requests a block of CVE numbers in advance (e.g., Red Hat currently requests CVEs in blocks of 500), the CVE number will be marked as reserved even though the CVE itself may not be assigned by the CNA for some time. Until the CVE is assigned, Mitre is made aware of it (i.e., the embargo passes and the issue is made public), and Mitre has researched the issue and written a description of it, entries will show up as "** RESERVED **".

=== Creation date ===
This is the date the entry was created. For CVEs assigned directly by Mitre, this is the date Mitre created the CVE entry. For CVEs assigned by CNAs (e.g., Microsoft, Oracle, HP, Red Hat) this is also the date that was created by Mitre, not by the CNA. When a CNA requests a block of CVE numbers in advance, the entry date is when the block was assigned to the CNA.

=== Obsolete fields ===
The following fields were previously used in CVE records, but are no longer used.

- Phase: The phase the CVE is in (e.g., CAN, CVE).
- Votes: Previously board members would vote yea or nay on whether or not the CAN should be accepted and turned into a CVE.
- Comments: Comments on the issue.
- Proposed: When the issue was first proposed.

== Changes to syntax ==
In order to support CVE IDs beyond CVE-YEAR-9999 (an issue known as the 'CVE10k problem') a change was made to the CVE syntax in 2014 and took effect on 13 January 2015. The new CVE-ID syntax has variable length, of the form CVE-YEAR-Arbitrary Digits. The variable-length arbitrary digits begin at four fixed digits and expand with arbitrary digits only when needed in a calendar year; for example, CVE-YYYY-NNNN and if needed CVE-YYYY-NNNNN, CVE-YYYY-NNNNNN, and so on. The schema is compatible with previously assigned CVE-IDs, which all include a minimum of four digits.

== Search CVE identifiers ==
The Mitre CVE database can be searched at the CVE List Search, and the NVD CVE database can be searched at Search CVE and CCE Vulnerability Database.

== CVE usage ==
CVE identifiers are intended for use with respect to identifying vulnerabilities:

Common Vulnerabilities and Exposures (CVE) is a dictionary of common names (i.e., CVE Identifiers) for publicly known information security vulnerabilities. CVE's common identifiers make it easier to share data across separate network security databases and tools, and provide a baseline for evaluating the coverage of an organization's security tools. If a report from one of your security tools incorporates CVE Identifiers, you may then quickly and accurately access fix information in one or more separate CVE-compatible databases to remediate the problem.

Users who have been assigned a CVE identifier for a vulnerability are encouraged to ensure that they place the identifier in any related security reports, web pages, emails, and so on.

== CVE assignment issues ==
Per section 7 of the CNA Rules, a vendor which received a report about a security vulnerability has full discretion in regards to it. This can lead to a conflict of interest situation, as a vendor may protect its reputation or financial interests by avoiding publicly announcing it as a security vulnerability, or patching it, by denying a CVE assignment at first place – a decision which Mitre can't reverse. The "!CVE" (not CVE) project, announced in 2023, aims to collect vulnerabilities that are denied by vendors, so long as they are considered valid by a panel of experts from the project.

CVE identifiers have been awarded for bogus issues and issues without security consequences. In response, a number of open-source projects have themselves applied to become the CVE Numbering Authority (CNA) of their own project.

== 2025 funding issues ==
On 15 April 2025, it was reported that the contract between MITRE and the US government, set to expire the day after, would be allowed to expire. Reports stated that the expiration of the contract would bring an end to the operational arm of the CVE program, including assigning new CVEs, while the database would remain accessible via GitHub.

Just prior to its expiration, the contract was extended for 11 months, averting the shutdown of the program.

The EU cybersecurity agency ENISA officially launched the European Vulnerability Database (EUVD). The database is free to use. It gathers information from vendors, incident response teams and other vulnerability databases, among them the CVE Program. Security researcher Patrick Garrity said the launch came while concern about the CVE Program's funding was widespread. He added that ENISA had developed the database in coordination with the CVE Program and did not intend it as a replacement.

Following the risk of funding expiration on March 16, 2026, the acting director of CISA Nick Andersen stated that the program is now being fully funded. Pete Allor, the co-founder of CVE Foundation, reported that the CVE programs funding had been restructured from a discretionary item to being one of the core programs to be funded.

== See also ==
- Common Vulnerability Scoring System (CVSS)
- Common Weakness Enumeration (CWE)
- Computer security
- European Union Vulnerability Database
- Software composition analysis
- Static application security testing
