= Common Weakness Enumeration =

Catalog of software weaknesses and vulnerabilities

Common Weakness Enumeration (CWE) logo

The Common Weakness Enumeration (CWE) is a category system for hardware and software weaknesses and vulnerabilities. It is sustained by a community project with the goals of understanding flaws in software and hardware and creating automated tools that can be used to identify, fix, and prevent those flaws. The project is sponsored by the office of the U.S. Department of Homeland Security (DHS) Cybersecurity and Infrastructure Security Agency (CISA), which is operated by The MITRE Corporation, with support from US-CERT and the National Cyber Security Division of the U.S. Department of Homeland Security.

The first release of the list and associated classification taxonomy was in 2006. Version 4.15 of the CWE standard was released in July 2024.

CWE has over 600 categories, including classes for buffer overflows, path/directory tree traversal errors, race conditions, cross-site scripting, hard-coded passwords, and insecure random numbers.

== Examples ==
- CWE category 121 is for stack-based buffer overflows.

== CWE compatibility ==
Common Weakness Enumeration (CWE) Compatibility program allows a service or a product to be reviewed and registered as officially "CWE-Compatible" and "CWE-Effective". The program assists organizations in selecting the right software tools and learning about possible weaknesses and their possible impact.

In order to obtain CWE Compatible status a product or a service must meet 4 out of 6 requirements, shown below:

CWE Searchable	users may search security elements using CWE identifiers
CWE Output	security elements presented to users include, or allow users to obtain, associated CWE identifiers
Mapping Accuracy	security elements accurately link to the appropriate CWE identifiers
CWE Documentation	capability's documentation describes CWE, CWE compatibility, and how CWE-related functionality in the capability is used
CWE Coverage	for CWE-Compatibility and CWE-Effectiveness, the capability's documentation explicitly lists the CWE-IDs that the capability claims coverage and effectiveness against locating in software
CWE Test Results	for CWE-Effectiveness, test results from the capability showing the results of assessing software for the CWEs are posted on the CWE Web site

There are 56 organizations as of September 2019 that develop and maintain products and services that achieved CWE Compatible status.

== Research, critiques, and new developments ==
Some researchers think that ambiguities in CWE can be avoided or reduced. There is also criticism that despite there being almost 1,000 CWE, 27% of them have never been associated with a vulnerability by NVD analysts.

As of 4/16/2024, the CWE Compatibility Program has been discontinued.

== See also ==
- Common Vulnerabilities and Exposures (CVE)
- Common Vulnerability Scoring System (CVSS)
- European Union Vulnerability Database
- National Vulnerability Database
