= Remedy =

Remedy, Remedies, The Remedy or Remediation may refer to:

== Computing and gaming ==
- Remedy Corp, an American software company
- Remedy Entertainment, a Finnish video game developer

== Law, politics, and society ==
- Environmental remediation, the removal of pollution or contaminants from the environment
- Legal remedy, an action by a court of law to impose its will
- Remedial education, the act or process of correcting a fault or resolving a deficiency: e.g., remediation of a learning disability
- Remediation (Marxist theory), a theory of media proposed by Jay David Bolter and Richard Grusin
- Remedy UK, a defunct pressure group representing junior doctors

== Medicine ==
- Cure, a medical treatment that ends an illness or condition
- Home remedy, a treatment that employs common items from the home
- Panacea (medicine), a medical cure-all or, metaphorically, a solution to all problems
- Pharmaceutical drug, any chemical substance intended for use in medical treatment
- Therapy, the attempted remediation of a health problem

== Film and television ==
- Remedy (film), a 2005 American crime drama
- Remedy, a 2009 short film by Karl T. Hirsch
- The Remedy (film), a 2026 American psychological supernatural horror film
- Remedy (TV series), a 2014 Canadian medical drama

== Music ==
- The Remedies (active 1997–2000s), a Nigerian hiphop music group
- Remedy (rapper) (born 1972), Ross Filler, member of the Wu-Tang Clan
- Remedy Records (Germany), a heavy metal label whose roster has included Soul Demise
- Remedy Records, a UK label that issues the albums of Dominic Brown

=== Albums ===
- Remedy (Basement Jaxx album), 1999
- Remedy (David Crowder Band album) or the title song, 2007
- Remedy (Old Crow Medicine Show album), 2014
- Remedy (The Red One), by Remedy Drive, 2001
- Remedy: A Live Album, by Remedy Drive, 2003
- The Remedy (Boyz II Men album), 2006
- The Remedy (Jagged Edge album), 2011
- The Remedy (Karima Francis album), 2012
- The Remedy (Kurt Rosenwinkel album), 2008
- The Remedy (Native Deen album), 2011
- The Remedy, an unreleased album by Rell, 2001
- Remedies (Dr. John album), 1970
- Remedies (The Herbaliser album), 1995

=== Songs ===
- "Remedy" (Alesso song), 2018
- "Remedy" (The Black Crowes song), 1992
- "Remedy" (Crookers song), 2010
- "Remedy" (Little Boots song), 2009
- "Remedy" (Professor Green song), 2011
- "Remedy" (Seether song), 2005
- "The Remedy (I Won't Worry)", by Jason Mraz, 2002
- "Remedy", by 30 Seconds to Mars from America, 2018
- "Remedy", by Adele from 25, 2015
- "Remedy", by the Band from High on the Hog, 1996
- "Remedy", by Cold from Year of the Spider, 2003
- "Remedy", by Disciple from Horseshoes & Handgrenades, 2010
- "Remedy", by Jagged Edge from Jagged Little Thrill, 2001
- "Remedy", by Laura Mvula from Pink Noise, 2021
- "Remedy", by Leony from Somewhere in Between, 2022
- "Remedy", by Maroon 5 from Jordi, 2021
- "Remedy", by Snoop Lion from Reincarnated, 2010
- Remedy, by Zac Brown Band from Jekyll + Hyde, 2015
- "The Remedy", by Abandoned Pools from Humanistic (album), 2001
- "The Remedy", by Polaris from The Mortal Coil (album), 2017
- "The Remedy", by Puscifer from Money Shot (album), 2015
