= Network enumeration =

Computing activity

Network enumeration is a computing activity in which usernames and info on groups, shares, and services of networked computers are retrieved. It should not be confused with network mapping, which only retrieves information about which servers are connected to a specific network and what operating system runs on them. Network enumeration is the discovery of hosts or devices on a network. Network enumeration tends to use overt discovery protocols such as ICMP and SNMP to gather information. It may also scan various ports on remote hosts for looking for well known services in an attempt to further identify the function of a remote host. The next stage of enumeration is to fingerprint the operating system of the remote host.

== Software ==
A network enumerator (also network scanner) is a computer program used to retrieve usernames and info on groups, shares, and services of networked computers. This type of program scans networks for vulnerabilities in the security of that network. If there is a vulnerability with the security of the network, it will send a report back to a hacker who may use this info to exploit that network glitch to gain entry to the network or for other malicious activities. Ethical hackers often also use the information to remove the glitches and strengthen their network.

Malicious (or "black-hat") hackers can, on entry of the network, get to security-sensitive information or corrupt the network making it useless. If this network belonged to a company which used this network on a regular basis, the company would lose the function to send information internally to other departments.

Network enumerators are often used by script kiddies for ease of use, as well as by more experienced hackers in cooperation with other programs/manual lookups. Also, whois queries, zone transfers, ping sweeps, and traceroute can be performed.

== List of network enumerators ==
- Metasploit Project
- Nmap
- Nessus
- OpenVAS
- SAINT (software)
- Security Administrator Tool for Analyzing Networks
- ZMap (software)

== See also ==
- Service scan
