= Nessus Attack Scripting Language =

Automation tool for computer vulnerability scanners

The Nessus Attack Scripting Language, usually referred to as NASL, is a scripting language that is used by vulnerability scanners like Nessus and OpenVAS. With NASL specific attacks can be automated, based on known vulnerabilities.

Tens of thousands of plugins have been written in NASL for Nessus and OpenVAS. Files that are written in this language usually get the file extension .nasl. For the exploitation of a zero day attack it is possible for an end user of Nessus or OpenVAS to write custom code in NASL which is executed by these vulnerability scanners.

In earlier versions of Nessus, a binary called nasl or nasl.exe was provided that could interpret NASL code to perform vulnerability scans. In later versions of Nessus, this should be done via an API that is provided by this software.

An example of executing a NASL plugin 'myzeroday.nasl' on Windows, a command such as the following could be invoked:

nasl.exe -t 127.0.0.1 "C:\temp\myzeroday.nasl"

An equivalent example of a Linux or UNIX command could look like this:

nasl -t 127.0.0.1 /tmp/myzeroday.nasl

If the plugin, in this example myzeroday.nasl, is placed in the same directory where other NASL plugins are located, it can also be included in standard scans by Nessus or OpenVAS, via the Web GUI or an API.

Many of the specifications of the formal language are similar to those of the programming language C and the scripting language Perl and those of other languages. Control flow such as the for loop, the if and if-else statements are part of the language and comments are preceded by a hash.

An example of "Hello World" in NASL is:

display("Hello World\n");

In the release notes of Nessus 6.10.0 of 1/31/2017, a new NASL compiler for faster plugins was mentioned.

== Sources ==
- Rogers, Russ (October 2011). "Chapter 11 NASL". Nessus Network Auditing (2nd ed.). Syngress. ISBN 9780080558653.
- "Using the 'nasl' Nessus Command Line Tool".
- "NASL API Documentation".
- "Basic Structure of NASL Scripts".
- Leonov, Alexander V. "Adding third party nasl plugins to OpenVAS" (Information Security Automation).
- "FreeBSD Manual Pages, Manual Reference Pages - OPENVAS-NASL (1)".
- Rathaus, Noam; Ramirez, Gilbert; Beale, Jay; Caswell, Brian (2005). "Chapter 1. The Inner Workings of NASL (Nessus Attack Scripting Language)". Nessus, Snort, and Ethereal Power Tools. Syngress. ISBN 9780080489421.
