= Nikto =

Nikto may refer to:

- Nikto (Star Wars), a fictional species in the Star Wars franchise
- Nikto (vulnerability scanner), computer security software
- "Klaatu barada nikto", a phrase from the 1951 film The Day the Earth Stood Still
