= ZMap =

ZMap may refer to:

- ZMap (software), a free and open-source network scanner
- ZMap, an algorithm for storing cutter location values
- ZMapp, an experimental treatment for Ebola virus disease
