= Gene Spafford =

American computer scientist

Eugene Howard Spafford
- Spaf
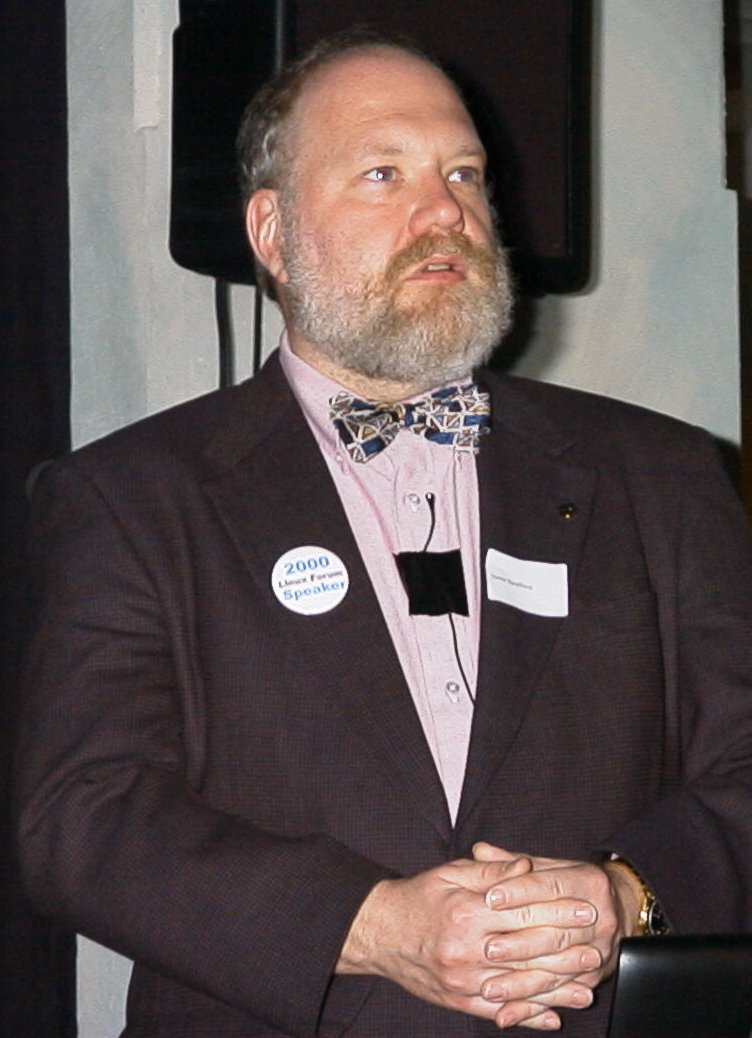
- Spafford in 2000
- Born: 1956 (age 69–70); Rochester, New York, United States
- Other names: Gene; Spaf
- Citizenship: United States
- Education: State University of New York Brockport (BA); Georgia Institute of Technology (MS, PhD)
- Awards: See section below
- Scientific career
- Fields: Computer science Computer security
- Workplaces: Purdue University
- Notable students: Dan Farmer, Gene Kim
- Website: spaf.cerias.purdue.edu

Eugene Howard Spafford (born 1956), known as Spaf, is an American distinguished professor of computer science at Purdue University and a computer security expert.

Spafford serves as an advisor to U.S. government agencies and corporations. In 1998, he founded and was the first director of the Center for Education and Research in Information Assurance and Security (CERIAS) at Purdue University.

== Biography ==
=== Education and early career ===
Spafford attended the State University of New York at Brockport, graduating with a double major in mathematics and computer science in three years. He then attended the School of Information and Computer Sciences (now the College of Computing) at the Georgia Institute of Technology. He received his Master of Science (M.S.) in 1981, and Doctor of Philosophy (Ph.D.) in 1986, for his design and implementation of the kernel of the original Clouds distributed operating system.

During the formative years of the Internet, Spafford made significant contributions to establishing semi-formal processes to organize and manage Usenet, then the primary channel of communication between users, and to defining the standards of behavior governing its use. Spafford initiated the Phage List as a response to the Morris Worm, one of the earliest computer worms.

=== Computer science at Purdue ===
Spafford has served on the faculty at Purdue University in Indiana since 1987, and is a Distinguished Professor of computer science. He is executive director emeritus of Purdue's Center for Education and Research in Information Assurance and Security (CERIAS), and founded its predecessor, the COAST Laboratory. He has stated that his research interests have focused on "the prevention, detection, and remediation of information system failures and misuse, with an emphasis on applied information security. This has included research in fault tolerance, software testing and debugging, intrusion detection, software forensics, and security policies."

Spafford wrote or co-authored four books on computer and computer security, including Practical Unix and Internet Security for O'Reilly Media, and over 150 research papers, chapters, and monographs. In 1996, he received the Award of Distinguished Technical Communication from the Society for Technical Communication for Practical Unix and Internet Security. In 2024, his book Cybersecurity Myths and Misconceptions for Addison-Wesley was named to the Cybersecurity Canon Hall of Fame.

As a PhD advisor, Spafford has advised 27 students to graduation. Among other projects, he designed the Open Source Tripwire tool coded by his undergraduate student Gene Kim. Spafford was the chief external technical advisor to the company Tripwire during their first few years. He was also an advisor to Dan Farmer who coded the freeware Computer Oracle and Password System (COPS) tool as a Purdue undergraduate.

In 2009, Spafford discussed on C-SPAN an article in The New York Times that looked at how the Internet had been a conduit for many types of cybercrime.

Recent work from Spafford has shown how to deceive adversaries and thus make computing systems more secure, drawing on his multi-disciplinary expertise in information security and psychology.

Spafford is on the board of directors of the Computing Research Association and is the former chairperson of the Association for Computing Machinery's (ACM) US Public Policy Committee. He was a member of the President's Information Technology Advisory Committee from 2003 to 2005 and an advisor to the National Science Foundation (NSF).

Spaf is a Fellow of the Association for Computing Machinery (1997), American Association for the Advancement of Science (1999), Institute of Electrical and Electronics Engineers (2000), ISC2 (2008), and the American Academy of Arts and Sciences (2020); he is a Distinguished Fellow of the Information Systems Security Association (2009).

== Selected honors and awards ==
- 1996 Awarded charter membership in the Institute of Electrical and Electronics Engineers (IEEE) IEEE Computer Society's Golden Core for distinguished service to the Computer Society during its first 50 years
- 2000 National Institute of Standards and Technology (NIST) and National Computer Security Center (NCSC) National Computer Systems Security Award
- 2001 Named to the Information Systems Security Association (ISSA) Hall of Fame
- 2003 Awarded United States Air Force medal for Meritorious Civilian Service
- 2007 ACM President's Award
- 2009 Computing Research Association Distinguished Service Award
- 2012 Named as a Purdue University Morrill Award recipient
- 2013 Elected to the National Cybersecurity Hall of Fame
- 2013 Received the ISC2 Harold F. Tipton Lifetime Achievement Award
- 2016 Named as a Sagamore of the Wabash
- 2017 Received the International Federation for Information Processing (IFIP) TC-11 Kristian Beckman Award
- 2020 IEEE Security and Privacy Symposium Test of Time Award
- 2022 Honorary Professor of the University of Nottingham.
- 2025 Named as a Distinguished Professor at Purdue University

== See also ==
- The Great Renaming
