= Gobuster =

Security software

- Stable release: 3.8.2 / 4 September 2025; 4 months ago
- Repository: github.com/OJ/gobuster
- Written in: Go
- License: Apache 2.0 License
- Website: github.com/OJ/gobuster

Gobuster is a software tool for brute forcing directories on web servers. It comes preinstalled with Kali Linux, a Linux distribution designed for digital forensics and penetration testing.

== See also ==
- Nikto
