= George Pedersen =

George Pedersen may refer to:

- George Pedersen (academic administrator) (born 1931), Canadian academic administrator
- George J. Pedersen (1935–2023), American billionaire and co-founder of ManTech International
