= Tenable, Inc. =

American cybersecurity company

Tenable Holdings, Inc.
- Formerly: Tenable Network Security, Inc.
- Type: Public
- Traded as: Nasdaq: TENB; Russell 2000 component
- Industry: Cybersecurity
- Founded: September 16, 2002; 24 years ago
- Founders: Ron Gula; Jack Huffard; Renaud Deraison
- Headquarters: Columbia, Maryland, U.S.
- Key people: Steve Vintz (co-CEO); Mark Thurmond (co-CEO); Matthew Brown (CFO); Art Coviello (chairman)
- Products: Nessus
- Revenue: ▲$999.4 million (2025)
- Operating income: ▼ −$9,168 thousand (2025)
- Net income: ▲ −$36.1 million (2025)
- Total assets: ▲$1.61 billion (2023)
- Total equity: ▲$346 million (2023)
- Owner: Amit Yoran (2.9%)
- Number of employees: 1,995 (2025)
- Website: tenable.com

Nessus Vulnerability Scanner
- Developers: Tenable, Inc.
- Release: April 1998; 28 years ago
- Stable release: 10.8.3 / September 11, 2024
- Operating system: Linux, macOS and Microsoft Windows
- Type: Vulnerability scanner
- License: Proprietary; GPL (2.2.11 and earlier)
- Website: tenable.com/products/nessus

Tenable Holdings, Inc. is a cybersecurity company based in Columbia, Maryland. Its vulnerability scanner software Nessus, developed in 1998, is one of the most widely deployed vulnerability assessment solutions in the cybersecurity industry. As of December 31, 2023, the company had approximately 44,000 customers, including 65% of the Fortune 500.

== History ==
Tenable was founded in September 2002 as Tenable Network Security, Inc. by Ron Gula, Jack Huffard, and Renaud Deraison. In April 1998, at age 17, Deraison had created the Nessus vulnerability scanner software, which he folded into Tenable upon creation of the company. In 2002, Gula, who worked for the National Security Agency in the 1990s, sold a company he founded to Enterasys Networks and was looking to start another company. In 2004, Marcus J. Ranum was hired as chief security officer. In October 2005, to generate income for the company and to stop empowering competition, Nessus became proprietary software, rather than open-source software via the GNU General Public License. At that time, the software was forked; OpenVAS became the open-source software version of the program.

In September 2012, Tenable received $50 million in series A round funding from Accel Partners. Also that month, the company entered into a partnership to provide cybersecurity services for the United States Intelligence Community, partnering with In-Q-Tel. In 2015, Tenable received $250 million in a series B round led by Insight Partners. In 2016, Gula resigned as CEO, becoming chairman. Effective January 2017, Amit Yoran became CEO of the company and later that year, the company was renamed Tenable, Inc. In July 2018, the company became a public company via an initial public offering.

In October 2022, the company launched Tenable One, an exposure management platform. In January 2023, the company launched a venture capital division, with plans to invest up to $25 million.

In December 2024, Yoran took a medical leave after a cancer diagnosis and CFO Stephen Vintz and COO Mark Thurmond were appointed interim co-CEOs; Yoran died in January 2025. Art Coviello was named chairman. In the same month, the company acquired Vulcan Cyber. In April 2025, the board made Vintz and Thurmond permanent co-CEOs.

=== Acquisitions ===
| # | Year | Company | Price | Description of Assets |
|---|---|---|---|---|
| 1 | October 2016 | FlawCheck | Undisclosed | Cybersecurity company |
| 2 | December 2019 | Indegy | $78 million | Israel-based operational technology company |
| 3 | April 2021 | Alsid | $98 million | Software for finding security issues in Active Directory deployments |
| 4 | October 2021 | Accurics | $160 million | cloud-native security for DevOps and security teams |
| 5 | June 2022 | Bit Discovery | $45 million | Attack surface management software startup |
| 6 | October 2023 | Ermetic | $240 million in cash and $25 million in restricted stock and RSUs | Israeli cloud-native application protection startup |
| 7 | June 2024 | Eureka | Undisclosed | Data security posture management |
| 8 | January 2025 | Vulcan Cyber | $150 million | Exposure Risk Management |
| 9 | May 2025 | Apex Security | $105 million | AI security |
