= Netwitness =

Network security company

NetWitness
- Type: Private
- Industry: Threat detection
- Predecessor: ManTech International, then Dell Technologies
- Founded: 1997
- Fate: Acquired by Symphony Technology Group
- Successor: EMC Corporation; RSA
- Headquarters: Bedford, Massachusetts, United States
- Area served: Worldwide
- Key people: Amit Yoran; Nick Lantuh
- Website: www.netwitness.com

NetWitness is a network security company that provides real-time network forensics automated threat detection, response, and analysis solutions. The company is based in Riverside, CA. In 2011, NetWitness was acquired by EMC Corporation and in 2020 was acquired by Symphony Technology Group as a stand-alone business unit, part of RSA Security. In 2025, NetWitness was acquired by PartnerOne.

== History ==
In the mid-1990s the NetWitness technology was established by CTX Corporation, a Washington, D.C.–based system integrator. The technology, initially chartered as a US Government research project, was created to help analysts better understand large volumes of captured network data for various types of investigations. CTX Corporation was subsequently acquired by ManTech International Corporation (Nasdaq: MANT) in December 2002.

In November 2006, ManTech International Corporation incubated and spun out its NetWitness information security product group as the venture-funded NetWitness Corporation. NetWitness focused on network forensics and content-analysis technology for incident response, investigations, and insider-threat related activities.

In February 2010, NetWitness announced the discovery of a major ZeuS botnet infestation impacting roughly 2,400 companies across the globe. The company dubbed this botnet the “Kneber ZeuS botnet” after the criminal gang was involved. This news went viral as it shed light on the continued vulnerabilities of the world's corporate Information Security practices and provided a deep dive understanding of the inner-workings of a botnet.

NetWitness Visualize, announced in July 2010, provided a new way to visualize network traffic.

In August 2010, NetWitness was named the 21st fastest growing private company in the United States in the annual Inc 500 report. With 7,745.8 percent three-year growth, the company was also ranked as the fastest growing privately held enterprise security product company and the fastest growing company in the Washington, D.C. area.

On April 1, 2011, NetWitness was acquired by EMC Corporation for an undisclosed amount. Former NetWitness products were integrated into EMC's security division, RSA Security.

On March 17th, 2025, NetWitness was acquired by PartnerOne.

On July 1, 2026 NetWitness appointed Steve Tcherchian as CEO.

== See also ==
- Zeus (malware)
- Security information and event management (SIEM)
