= 2016 United States presidential election recounts =

Recounts completed Recounts halted or rejected

Following Republican nominee Donald Trump's Electoral College victory in the United States presidential election of 2016, a group of computer scientists, cyber security experts, and election monitors raised concerns about the integrity of the election results. They urged the campaign staff of Democratic nominee Hillary Clinton, who had conceded the campaign on November 9, to petition for a recount in three key states: Michigan, Pennsylvania, and Wisconsin. When the Clinton campaign declined to file for recounts, Green Party presidential nominee Jill Stein agreed to spearhead the recount effort on November 23, on the grounds that unspecified "anomalies" may have affected the election's outcome. The Clinton team subsequently pledged to support the recount efforts "in order to ensure the process proceeds in a manner that is fair to all sides." President-elect Trump and his supporters filed legal motions in all three states to prevent the recounts. Two other states were the subject of recount bids that were separate from Stein's efforts in the Rust Belt states: American Delta Party/Reform Party presidential candidate Rocky De La Fuente filed for a partial recount in Nevada on November 30, and three Florida citizens filed for a complete hand recount in their state on December 6.

In accordance with the Electoral Count Act, all states must certify and submit their final election results to the electoral college six days before the college meets. Under this "safe harbor" provision, any recount efforts for the 2016 election had to be completed before the deadline of December 13, 2016. The recount in Nevada went forward and were completed on schedule, resulting in only minor changes to vote tallies. Wisconsin permitted individual counties to decide whether to provide paper ballots for recount or merely to rerun the same computer totals. A recount in Michigan was allowed to proceed for three days before being halted by court order, and a federal lawsuit to compel a recount in Pennsylvania was dismissed. While the partial Michigan recount did unearth some instances of improper ballot handling and possible voter fraud, no indications of widespread hacking were discovered, and the overall outcome of the election remained unchanged, despite the evidence that the voting machines were old and faulty, possibly counting as "blank" ballots many that contained visually clear indications of presidential choice.

== Background ==
After the election, a group of prominent computer scientists and election lawyers including J. Alex Halderman, (director of the University of Michigan Center for Computer Security and Society) and John Bonifaz, (founder of the National Voting Rights Institute) began studying the election results and found statistical anomalies. For example, Clinton's votes were 7% lower than expected in counties that used electronic voting machines to tally votes, as opposed to using paper ballots and optical scan voting systems; in Wisconsin, there was a significant increase in the number of absentee ballots and Trump did far better than expected in counties that used only electronic voting; and there was a sizable increase in the number of ballots cast in Michigan that left the presidential field blank.

The 2016 presidential election was also unprecedented in that, as The Guardian reports:

"The election had taken place against a backdrop of warnings from the US government that Russian hackers were "scanning and probing" the election systems of American states, and were behind the theft of emails from the Democratic National Committee and John Podesta, the chairman of Hillary Clinton's presidential campaign. Eight days before the election, the White House had used an emergency hotline to warn Russia against further interference."

The loose coalition of computer scientists and lawyers advocated for an election recount in three battleground states (Wisconsin, Pennsylvania, and Michigan) where President-elect Trump had narrow victories of less than 1%. Trump won Michigan by 10,704 votes (0.2%), Pennsylvania by 49,543 (0.8%), and Wisconsin by 27,257 votes (0.7%). A shift of half of these from Trump to Clinton would mean Clinton would get enough electoral votes to win, and a shift in these states would constitute the smallest shift which would have this effect. In order to petition these states, a presidential candidate would need to file the recount request. Stein agreed to lead the effort after the group was unable to persuade the Clinton team to file.

While most experts agree that voter fraud and cyberattacks are possible, they disagree about the extent to which these could have impacted the results of the 2016 presidential election. Statistician Nate Silver performed a regression analysis which demonstrated that the alleged discrepancy between paper ballots and electronic voting machines "completely disappears once you control for race and education level". However, two Stanford University students named Rodolfo Cortes and Alex Geijsel, and a trio of statisticians who write for the website U.S. Economic Snapshot named Thomas Cooley, Ben Griffy and Peter Rupert also analyzed those claims and found that though demographics accounted for some of the vote total, there was still a significant correlation with voting machine use. On November 23, Halderman wrote,

"I believe the most likely explanation is that the polls were systematically wrong, rather than that the election was hacked. But I don't believe that either one of these seemingly unlikely explanations is overwhelmingly more likely than the other."

=== Funding campaign and expenses ===
The donation page of Jill Stein's 2016 presidential election recount efforts on November 24, 2016.

A funding campaign to cover the legal costs of the various recounts began on November 23, with an initial goal of $2.2 million to cover filing fees in Wisconsin. Donors quickly reached and surpassed that goal, which was subsequently raised to $4.5 million to cover filing fees in Pennsylvania. That was met on November 25, and the goal was raised a second time to $7 million for Michigan's filing fees. The goal was raised a third time to $9.5 million on November 28 after Wisconsin increased its filing fees. The total funds raised by the Stein campaign for the recounts eventually reached $7.33 million, with nearly 161,300 individual donors contributing in all.

Following the conclusion of the recount efforts, the Stein campaign claimed that costs for the recounts totaled $7.43 million, exceeding the amount that was raised. A published breakdown of expenditures showed that $212,500 was spent on staff payroll; $364,000 on consultants; $353,618 on administrative expenses such as travel costs; $3,499,689 on the filing fees in Wisconsin; $16,000 on the filing fees in Pennsylvania; $973,250 on the filing fees in Michigan; $1,630,200 on associated legal expenses; $150,000 on ongoing litigation as of December 13; and a final $150,000 on compliance costs.

== Filings ==
=== Wisconsin ===
On November 25, 90 minutes before the deadline, Stein filed a petition to the Wisconsin Elections Commission for a recount of the state's votes. A request for a recount was also made by Independent presidential candidate Rocky De La Fuente. In Wisconsin, a recount would involve a manual examination of all three million ballots, with a completion deadline of December 13.

On November 26, the Clinton campaign's general counsel Marc Elias stated that their campaign would join Stein's recount efforts in Wisconsin and possibly others "in order to ensure the process proceeds in a manner that is fair to all sides." He also noted that, "Because we had not uncovered any actionable evidence of hacking or outside attempts to alter the voting technology, we had not planned to exercise this option ourselves."

On November 28, the Wisconsin Elections Commission rejected Stein's request for a hand recount of all votes, and Stein sought to overturn the decision in court. On November 29, after Stein paid $3.5 million needed to initiate a recount, the Wisconsin Elections Commission ordered a recount in the state to begin on December 1.

Several academics and specialists submitted testimony in support of Stein's lawsuit seeking a recount. Poorvi Vora of George Washington University stated that vote-scanning machinery could be infected with malware that changes the record of votes, and a manual count of paper ballots would be the only way to know if there had been vote manipulation. Professor Philip Stark from the University of California also claimed that Trump's winning margin in Wisconsin could easily be within the margin of error for optical voting systems. Despite this testimony, Dane County Judge Valerie Bailey-Rihn refused to order a hand recount for the whole state, even though she encouraged them to recount by hand.

On December 2, a Trump Super PAC filed a federal lawsuit to halt the recount in Wisconsin arguing that it fails the United States Supreme Court's test for Equal Protection in the Florida election recount process established in Bush v. Gore. U.S. District Judge James Peterson denied the emergency halt to the recount, allowing the process to continue at least until a December 9 court hearing. At that hearing, Judge Petersen declined to halt the recount, noting that the process was nearly complete and there was virtually no chance that it would change the results of the election. While the lawsuit was not dismissed, Petersen said he would decide whether to do so within the next few days.

Wisconsin's recount was completed and its results certified early on December 12, well before the state-imposed 8:00pm deadline that same day. Clinton increased her vote total in the state by 713 votes, while Trump increased his by 844, widening his lead by 131 votes over the original November 8 count and reaffirming his victory there. Wisconsin Elections Commission Chairman Mark Thomsen stated that the recount had uncovered no evidence that any of the state's voting machines had been hacked or otherwise tampered with.

=== Pennsylvania ===
Stein announced on November 25 that she intended to file for similar recounts in Michigan and Pennsylvania. She did so in Pennsylvania on November 28, seven days after the official deadline of November 21, by applying to a court and asking them to order a recount.

On December 2, Trump and the Republican Party of Pennsylvania asked a court to dismiss the recount. They argued Pennsylvania law does not permit a court-ordered recount, and a Green Party lawyer acknowledged that the lawsuit was without precedent in the state.

On December 3, Stein and the Green Party formally withdrew their lawsuit seeking a statewide recount in Pennsylvania, stating that they were unable to produce the required $1 million bond before the court-ordered deadline at 5:00pm on December 5, which would have followed a court hearing earlier that day on whether to proceed with the case. The next day, December 4, an attorney representing the Green Party declared the Party's intent to file a lawsuit in a federal court to force Pennsylvania to carry out a recount, asserting that such a step was necessary because the state court system was ill-equipped to handle the matter.

Green Party lawyers filed the federal lawsuit on December 5, asserting that Pennsylvania's legal barriers to a recount amounted to a violation of voters' constitutional rights and a recount should be compelled. U.S. District Judge Paul S. Diamond scheduled a hearing on the lawsuit for December 9. During the hearing, lawyers for Stein presented testimony alleging that although poor polling was likely to blame for any deviations between election results and polls, the possibility of hacking could not be ruled out. A former Pennsylvania voting machine inspector testified on behalf of lawyers for the Republican Party that the situations put forward by Stein's experts were highly unlikely and lacked any supporting evidence. Judge Diamond himself expressed concerns that Pennsylvania's voters would be disenfranchised if the state's election results were not certified in time for the December 13 deadline due to a recount.

On December 12, Diamond rejected Stein and the Green Party's lawsuit, ending the recount effort in Pennsylvania and allowing the state to certify its original November 8 results.

=== Michigan ===
Stein filed for a manual recount in Michigan on November 30, paying the $973,250 fee required for filing. The recount policy in Michigan is to count every ballot manually. A manual count is required because the machines used to vote have no audit trail features. According to Stein a recount in Michigan should have been pursued because of a "sky-high number of blank votes" for the presidency, since there were 87,810 ballots that were counted as not voting for president. Despite the money raised by Stein, Ruth Johnson, the Michigan Secretary of State, said that the recounting process might require up to $4 million of Michigan taxpayers' money.

On December 1, the Trump campaign challenged Michigan's recount arguing that the recount couldn't be finished on time and that Stein's petition wasn't properly notarized, delaying the planned recount which was to begin the next day. On December 2, with Michigan's Board of State Canvassers deadlocked 2–2, along party lines, the recount in Michigan was to proceed on December 6, barring court action, which Bill Schuette the Michigan Attorney General has requested.

Shortly after midnight on December 5, U.S. District Judge Mark A. Goldsmith ordered the recount in Michigan to begin at 12:00pm that day, bypassing a normally required waiting period of two days that would have caused the recount to begin on December 7. The timing of the recount had been the subject of a court hearing the previous day, in which lawyers representing Stein pushed for an immediate recount and lawyers for the Republican Party argued circumventing the waiting period was unnecessary. Michigan election officials began the recount as ordered.

On December 6, the Michigan Court of Appeals declared that Stein had no standing to seek a recount because she finished fourth in the election, garnering 1% of the vote, and therefore did not qualify as an "aggrieved" candidate under state law. The court ordered the state election board to reject Stein's recount petition. Attorney General Schuette stated the court's decision meant the ongoing recount "must stop", but an attorney representing Stein insisted the recount would continue. Judge Goldsmith, whose earlier ruling ordering the recount to begin had dealt with only the timing of the recount and not whether it should proceed, called a hearing for the morning of December 7 to address Schuette's request to set aside his ruling in light of the state court's decision. While Goldsmith deliberated after the hearing, the Michigan election board also met and decided to refrain from acting on the state court's ruling until Goldsmith had issued his new decision, and Stein appealed the state court's ruling to the Michigan Supreme Court. Goldsmith agreed to order the stoppage of the recount later that day, noting that while Stein's efforts had highlighted the vulnerability of Michigan's voting system to tampering, no evidence of such tampering had been presented, despite the evidence of Michigan's voting machines breaking down and not counting possibly over 87,000 votes for president that were not blank.

On December 9, the Michigan Supreme Court denied Jill Stein's appeal to restart the recount in a 3–2 ruling, permitting the original November 8 election results to be certified.

Prior to the halt of the recount, 3,047 precincts across 22 of Michigan's 83 counties had completed their recounts, which resulted in a net gain of 102 votes for Hillary Clinton. Additionally, 59 percent of precincts in Detroit were ineligible for recount, as the number of ballots stored in containers in case of a recount did not match tallies given by voting machine printout reports.

=== Nevada ===
On November 30, American Delta Party/Reform Party presidential candidate Rocky De La Fuente requested a recount in five counties in Nevada and paid the $14,000 fee required for the effort. These counties were Douglas, Mineral, Nye, and Clark, as well as the independent city of Carson City. De La Fuente called his recount request a counterbalance to the recount that Jill Stein sought in Wisconsin, and stated that while he did not expect to win Nevada, he was concerned about the integrity of the vote.

De La Fuente was entitled under state law to select a sample of 5% of Nevada's precincts to be recounted, totaling 93 precincts, but he selected only 92. If the results from the sample revealed a discrepancy of 1% or more in favor of either De La Fuente or Hillary Clinton, who won the state on election day, a full statewide recount would have been launched. As De La Fuente won only 202 votes across the precincts he selected for the recount, a deviation of as little as 3 votes would have triggered a statewide recount, though Secretary of State of Nevada Barbara Cegavske would have had discretion to determine if a recount was warranted.

The Nevada partial recount was completed on December 8. It resulted in no change in the number of votes cast for De La Fuente, but Clinton lost 9 votes and Trump lost 6 due to absentee ballot errors. The recount involved 93,840 ballots in total.

=== Florida ===
On December 6, three voters from central Florida, Leonisia Olivares, Jerry W. Lapidus, and Judith L. Craig, filed a lawsuit in Leon Circuit Court, calling for a hand recount of all Florida ballots to be conducted. The plaintiffs alleged that hacking, malfunctioning machines, and substantial voter fraud altered the results in the state of Florida in favor of Donald Trump, and asserted that Hillary Clinton would have won otherwise. They further insisted the recount be paid for by the defendants named in the lawsuit, who included Trump, Governor Rick Scott, and Florida's 29 presidential electors. An attorney representing the plaintiffs noted that each of the defendants had to respond to the lawsuit before it could go forward, however, and there was no guarantee all of them would do so before the electoral college met on December 19. The lawsuit was called a "long-shot", and by December 12, the day before the deadline for states to certify their election results, the Florida courts had not yet taken up the case. Leon Circuit Judge John Cooper eventually dismissed the suit, after which the plaintiffs appealed to the Florida First District Court of Appeal to overturn the dismissal, and requested that the electoral college's vote be postponed to allow the recount to be conducted. Judge Scott Makar struck down both motions, stating in his ruling that the lawsuit "is nothing more than a political question masquerading as a lawsuit and should be dispatched on that basis."

== Results ==
A November 26 statement from the Obama administration acknowledged Russian efforts to interfere in the election, but expressed confidence in the integrity of the electoral infrastructure, indicating that the results of the election "accurately reflect the will of the American people." On November 27, the White House released another statement saying, "the federal government did not observe any increased level of malicious cyberactivity aimed at disrupting our electoral process on Election Day."

== Reactions ==
On November 26, Trump released a statement, speaking out against Stein's decision, calling the recount a "scam" whose real aim is to fill the Green Party's coffers, and saying that "the election is over". Stein responded by saying the donations for the recount are "all going into a dedicated and segregated account so that it can only be spent on the recount." Recount accounts are covered under the Federal Election Commission Advisory Opinion 2006–24, which left the use of any remaining funds to be settled by the FEC at a later time.

Trump also used Twitter to allege that "serious voter fraud" had occurred in California, New Hampshire, and Virginia, and claimed, without citing evidence, that "millions of people" voted illegally. On January 25, 2017, President Trump vowed to start a federal investigation into alleged voter fraud. In June 2019, Trump referenced a settlement that Judicial Watch had recently reached with California "where California admitted to a million votes...there was much illegal voting." The Judicial Watch settlement actually related to purging 1.5 million inactive individuals from voter registration rolls.

According to Politico, many of Clinton's closest allies were "irritated with Jill Stein" and did not believe that the recount would change the election's results, though they did feel that they had an obligation to participate.

Stein's former running mate Ajamu Baraka opposed the recount efforts, writing in a Facebook post, "The recount effort has resulted in serious questions regarding the motivations of the recount that threatens to damage the standing and reputation of the Green Party, its supporters and activists". He also told CNN, "It would be seen as carrying the water for the Democrats". The Green Party's Maryland Senate candidate Margaret Flowers circulated an open letter, which has signatures from many prominent Green Party members, opposing the recount. The letter read, "While we support electoral reforms, including how the vote is counted, we do not support the current recount being undertaken by Jill Stein".

== See also ==
- Elections in the United States
- 2000 United States presidential election recount in Florida
