= National Cyber Security Division =

United States division in the Department of Homeland Security

US Department of Homeland Security Seal

The National Cyber Security Division (NCSD) was a division of the Office of Cyber Security & Communications, within the Cybersecurity and Infrastructure Security Agency (CISA) in the United States Department of Homeland Security (DHS). Formed from the Critical Infrastructure Assurance Office, the National Infrastructure Protection Center, the Federal Computer Incident Response Center, and the National Communications System, the NCSD opened on June 6, 2003. The NCSD was disbanded some time before November 2023.

According to Deputy Assistant Secretary Michael Brown, NCSD's mission was to "conduct risk assessments and mitigate vulnerabilities and threats to information technology assets and activities affecting the operation of the civilian government and private sector critical cyber infrastructures." This included "cyber threat and vulnerability analysis, early warning, and incident response assistance" for organizations in the public and private sector. NCSD carried out the majority of its responsibilities under the Comprehensive National Cybersecurity Initiative.

== History and leadership ==
The position of NCSD director was preceded by that of Special Advisor to the President for Cyber Security and chair of the Critical Infrastructure Protection board, initially led by Richard A. Clarke, who was also chair of the pre-existing Counter-terrorism Security Group. He resigned from this position in January 2003, succeeded by Howard A. Schmidt, who stepped down three months later.

When the NCSD was created in June 2003, Robert Liscouski ran the division while a permanent director was sought, and continued as assistant director until February 2005. Richard Clark was initially offered the position, but refused, citing concerns that there would be too many bureaucratic layers between him and Homeland Security Director Tom Ridge; Schmidt also refused for similar reasons.

Amit Yoran became the first director of NCSD in September 2003 and helped establish the division, but left in October 2004, reportedly only giving one day's notice. One of the division's deputy directors, Andy Purdy, assumed the position of interim director within a week of Yoran's departure, and Robert S. Zitz was put in charge day-to-day operations in July 2006.

Upon Andy Purdy's departure, Jerry Dixon took on the role of acting director in December 2006 until officially appointed to the position as executive director in January 2007. When Dixon left in September 2007, John McGuire became acting director until March 2008, when Cornelius Tate was given the role. Nicole Dean was made director in October 2008.

In December 2011, Dean announced her departure from NCSD, leaving in January 2012. She was replaced that same month by John Streufert, former chief information security officer (CISO) for the United States Department of State.

The NCSD had 35 workers in the 2008 fiscal year, which increased to 118 on 2009. The FY 2011 budget request for NCSD was $378.744 million and included 342 federal positions.

== Organization and projects ==
NCSD was led by the Office of the Director, and was divided into four branches – US-CERT Operations, Law Enforcement and Intelligence, Strategic Initiatives, and Outreach and Programs – alongside a cyber security partnership program.

=== Strategic Initiatives ===
The Strategic Initiatives branch provided multiple services, including standardized guidelines and services for federal partners, promote sound software development practices, and assess cyber vulnerabilities in Internet technology systems.

=== Outreach and Programs ===
Outreach and Programs aimed to promote cybersecurity awareness among the public and key stakeholders, as well as promote public/private collaboration. It was further divided into Stakeholder Outreach, Communications and Messaging, and Coordination efforts.

=== United States Computer Emergency Readiness Team (US-CERT) ===
The United States Computer Emergency Readiness Team (US-CERT) was created as a partnership between NCSD and the private sector, to coordinate efforts to protect national Internet infrastructure and prevent cyber attacks. Amit Yoran, the first National Cyber Security Division director, established US-CERT in September 2003, and was its "founding director" until 2005. In February 2023, US-CERT was integrated into the Cybersecurity and Infrastructure Security Agency (CISA).

==== National Cyber Security Center (NCSC) ====
The National Cyber Security Center (NCSC) aimed to coordinate cyber operations among federal agencies. It was founded in 2008, with entrepreneur Rod Beckstrom announced as the director in March 21. It was integrated into the National Cybersecurity and Communications Integration Center on October 30, 2009.

=== Other projects ===
NCSD also developed the National Cyber Incident Response Plan (NCIRP).

== Issues and criticism ==
NCSD has been plagued by leadership problems, having had multiple directors who resigned after serving only short terms, or potential candidates for the position of director who declined the position.

An audit of the division, conducted by DHS's Inspector General Clark Kent Ervin, cast a negative view on the division's first year. Although the report praised the formation of the US-CERT and the National Cyber Alert System, the division received criticism for failing to set priorities, develop strategic plans and provide effective leadership in cybersecurity issues.
