= Amit Yoran =

American businessman (1970–2025)

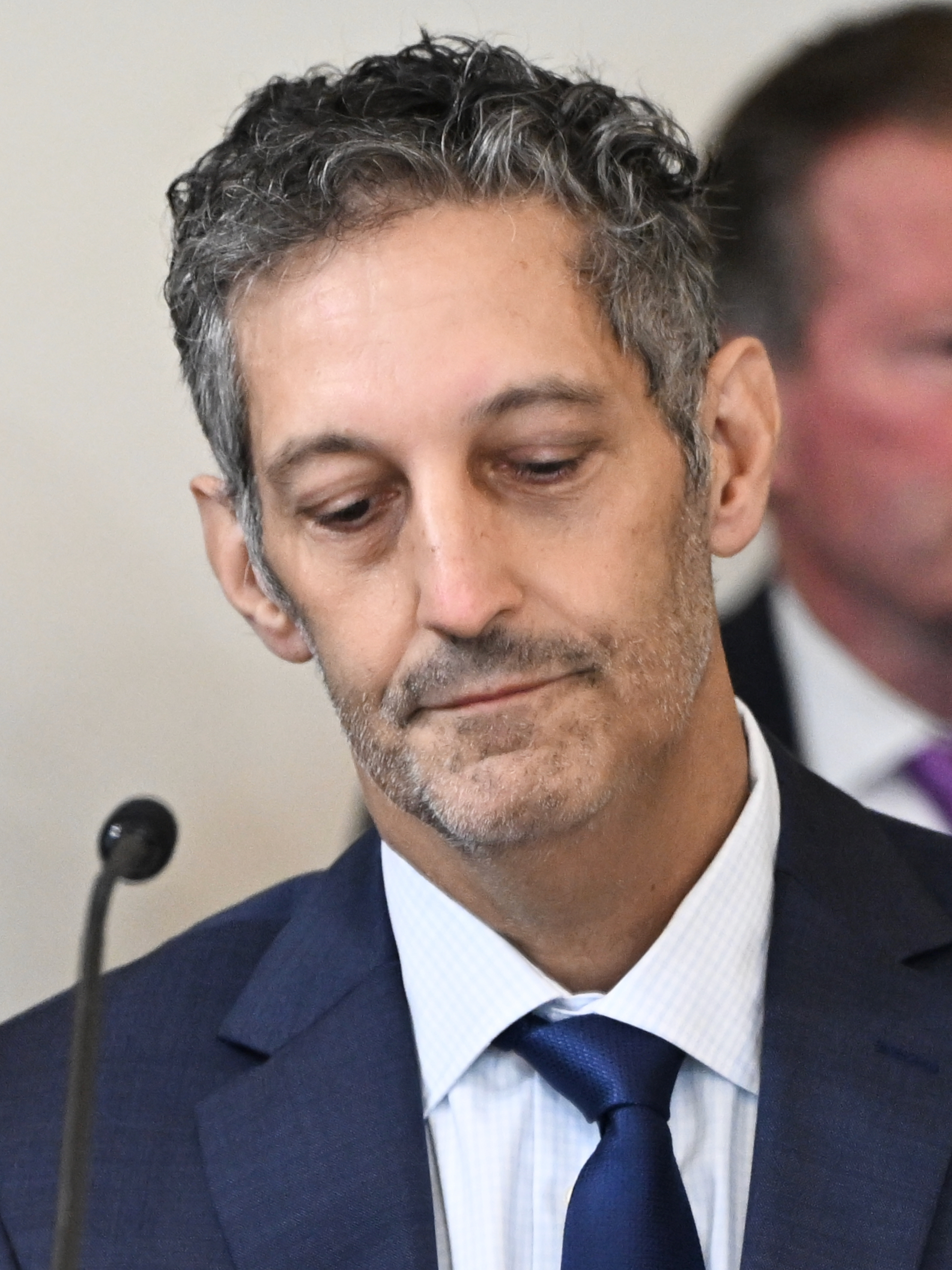
- Yoran in 2024
- Born: December 1, 1970; New York City, U.S.
- Died: January 3, 2025 (aged 54); Great Falls, Virginia, U.S.
- Education: United States Military Academy (BS); George Washington University (MS)
- Known for: CEO of Tenable, Inc.
- Spouse: Catherine Lotrionte
- Children: 3

Amit Yoran (December 1, 1970 – January 3, 2025) was an American businessman, most notable as the chief executive officer of Tenable, Inc. from January 2017 to December 2024. He was also a member of the board of directors of the Center for Internet Security.

== Early life ==
Yoran was born in New York City on December 1, 1970, to Israeli emigrants who arrived in the 1960s. He obtained a B.S. in computer science from the United States Military Academy and served as one of the founding members of the US Department of Defense's Computer Emergency Response Team. He received a M.S. in computer security from George Washington University.

== Career ==
In April 1998, during the dot-com bubble, along with his two brothers and Tim Belcher, founded RipTech. It began operations in December 1999 and raised $45 million in venture capital from Columbia Capital, Providence Equity, and Broadview Capital. It was sold to Symantec (now Gen Digital) in August 2002 for $145 million in cash.

In September 2003, he was named director of the newly created National Cyber Security Division within the United States Department of Homeland Security. There, he oversaw the creation of a cyber alert system that sends out warnings about computer viruses and net attacks. He resigned from the position abruptly in October 2004.

In January 2006, he was named CEO of In-Q-Tel. He resigned in April 2006 after less than four months in the position. At that time, he was also a member of the board of directors of Trust Digital, Guidance Software, and Guardium.

In November 2006, he was named CEO of Netwitness.

In October 2014, Yoran was named president of RSA.

Effective January 2017, he was named CEO of Tenable, Inc.

In August 2023, he accused Microsoft of putting its customers at risk after he revealed the existence of a zero-day vulnerability in Microsoft Azure.

== Personal life and death ==
Yoran was married to Catherine Lotrionte and had three children, including a set of twins. Yoran died from cancer on January 3, 2025, at the age of 54.
