= The Coroner's Toolkit =

Computer security program suite

- Original authors: Dan Farmer and Wietse Venema
- Stable release: 1.19 / August 29, 2009
- Operating system: Unix-like
- Type: Computer forensics
- License: IBM Public License
- Website: www.porcupine.org/forensics/tct.html

The Coroner's Toolkit (or TCT) is a suite of free computer security programs by Dan Farmer and Wietse Venema for digital forensic analysis. The suite runs under several Unix-related operating systems: FreeBSD, OpenBSD, BSD/OS, SunOS/Solaris, Linux, and HP-UX. TCT is released under the terms of the IBM Public License.

Parts of TCT can be used to aid analysis of and data recovery from computer disasters.

TCT was superseded by The Sleuth Kit. Although TSK is only partially based on TCT, the authors of TCT have accepted it as official successor to TCT.
