= Shodan (website) =

American web search engine

- Website type: search engine
- Available in: English
- Creator: John Matherly
- Website: www.shodan.io
- Registration: Optional
- Launched: 2009
- Current status: Active

Shodan is a search engine that lets users search for various types of servers (webcams, routers, servers, etc.) connected to the internet using a variety of filters. Some have also described it as a search engine of service banners, which is metadata that the server sends back to the client. This can be information about the server software, what options the service supports, a welcome message or anything else that the client can find out before interacting with the server.

Shodan collects data mostly on web servers (HTTP/HTTPS – ports 80, 8080, 443, 8443), as well as FTP (port 21), SSH (port 22), Telnet (port 23), SNMP (port 161), IMAP (ports 143, or (encrypted) 993), SMTP (port 25), SIP (port 5060), and Real Time Streaming Protocol (RTSP, port 554). The latter can be used to access webcams and their video streams.

It was launched in 2009 by computer programmer John Matherly, who, in 2003, conceived the idea of searching devices linked to the Internet. The name Shodan is a reference to SHODAN, a character from the System Shock video game series.

== History ==
The website began as Matherly's pet project, based on the fact that large numbers of devices and computer systems are connected to the Internet. Shodan has since been used to find systems including control systems for water plants, power grids and a cyclotron.

In May 2013, CNN Money released an article detailing how Shodan can be used to find vulnerable systems on the Internet, including traffic light controls. They show screenshots of those systems, which provided the warning banner "DEATH MAY OCCUR !!!" upon connecting.

In September 2013, Shodan was referenced in a Forbes article claiming it was used in order to find the security flaws in TRENDnet security cameras. The next day, Forbes followed up with a second article talking about the types of things that can be found using Shodan. This included Caterpillar trucks whose onboard monitoring systems were accessible, heating and security control systems for banks, universities, and corporate giants, surveillance cameras, and fetal heart monitors.

In December 2015, various news outlets, including Ars Technica, reported that a security researcher used Shodan to identify accessible MongoDB databases on thousands of systems, including one hosted by Kromtech, the developer of the macOS security tool MacKeeper.

In November 2021, PCMagazine described how Shodan was used by AT&T to detect internet of things devices infected with malware.

In September 2025, Cisco security researchers used Shodan to discover over 1,100 publicly exposed Ollama LLM servers.

== Usage ==
The website scans the Internet for publicly accessible devices. Shodan currently returns 10 results to users without an account and 50 to those with one. If users want to remove the restriction, they are required to provide a reason and pay a fee. The primary users of Shodan are cybersecurity professionals, researchers and law enforcement agencies. While cybercriminals can also use the website, some have access to botnets that could accomplish the same task without detection.

== See also ==
- Nmap
