= Wietse Venema =

American computer scientist (born 1951)

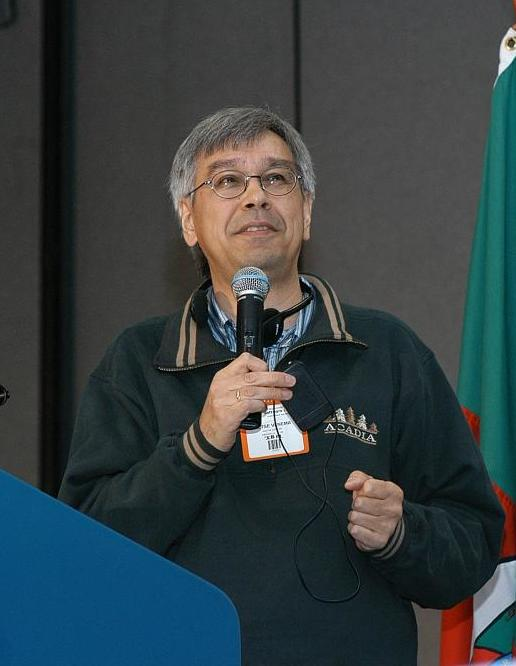
- Venema in 2004
- Born: 1951 (age 74–75); Jakarta
- Education: University of Groningen
- Known for: Postfix MTA, TCP Wrappers, Security Administrator Tool for Analyzing Networks, The Coroner's Toolkit
- Scientific career
- Fields: Computer science
- Institutions: Google, Inc. Thomas J. Watson Research Center; Eindhoven University of Technology
- Wietse Venema demonstrating the pronunciation of his name

Wietse Zweitze Venema (born 1951) is a Dutch programmer and physicist best known for writing the Postfix email system. He also wrote TCP Wrapper and collaborated with Dan Farmer to produce the computer security tools SATAN and The Coroner's Toolkit.

== Biography ==
He studied physics at the University of Groningen, continuing there to get a PhD in 1984 with the dissertation Left-right symmetry in nuclear beta decay. He spent 12 years at Eindhoven University as a systems architect in the Mathematics and Computer Science department, and spent part of this time writing tools for Electronic Data Interchange. Since emigrating to the U.S. in 1996 he worked for the IBM Thomas J. Watson Research Center in New York State until 2015. On March 24, 2015, he announced he was leaving IBM for Google. He retired at the end of January, 2023, but continues to actively support the open-source Postfix mail system and the DFRWS digital forensics research conferences.

== Awards ==
Awards Venema has received for his work:

- Security Summit Hall of Fame Award (July 1998)
- SAGE Outstanding Achievement Award (November 1999)
- NLUUG Award (November 2000)
- Sendmail Milter Innovation Award (November 2006)
- The 2008 Free Software Foundation Award for the Advancement of Free Software (March 2009)
- ISSA Hall of Fame Award (October 2012)
