= OpenVAS =

Computer vulnerability scanning software

- Developer: Greenbone Networks GmbH
- Stable release: 23.52.8 / 29 October 2026; 5 days ago
- Written in: C
- Operating system: Cross-platform
- Type: Vulnerability scanner
- License: GPL
- Website: www.openvas.org
- Repository: github.com/greenbone/openvas-scanner

OpenVAS (Open Vulnerability Assessment Scanner, originally known as GNessUs) is the scanner component of Greenbone Vulnerability Management (GVM), a software framework of several services and tools offering vulnerability scanning and vulnerability management.

Greenbone Community Edition is free software, and most components are licensed under the GNU General Public License (GPL). Plugins for Greenbone Vulnerability Management are written in the Nessus Attack Scripting Language, NASL. Greenbone also offer OpenVAS BASIC and OpenVAS SCAN on a subscription basis.

== History ==
Greenbone Vulnerability Manager began under the name of OpenVAS, and before that the name GNessUs, as a fork of the previously open source Nessus scanning tool, after its developers Tenable Network Security changed it to a proprietary (closed source) license in October 2005. OpenVAS was originally proposed by pentesters at SecuritySpace, discussed with pentesters at Portcullis Computer Security and then announced by Tim Brown on Slashdot.

Greenbone Vulnerability Manager is a member project of Software in the Public Interest.

== Structure ==
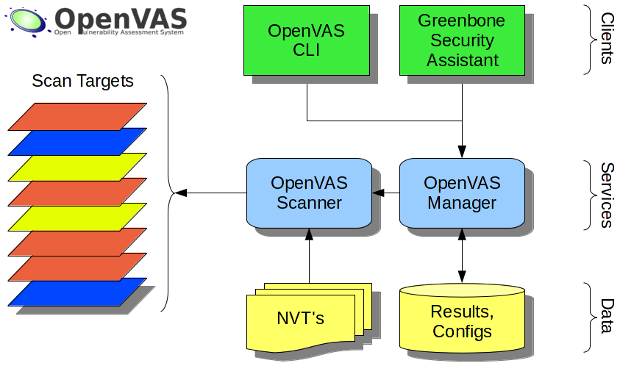
The OpenVAS 8 Structure

There is a daily updated feed of Network Vulnerability Tests (NVTs). As of January 2019, there were over 50,000 NVTs. As of October 2024, there were 160,000 NVTs.

== Documentation ==
The OpenVAS protocol structure aims to be well-documented to assist developers. The OpenVAS Compendium is a publication of the OpenVAS Project that delivers documentation on OpenVAS.

== See also ==
- Aircrack-ng
- BackBox
- BackTrack
- Kali Linux
- Kismet (software)
- List of free and open-source software packages
- Metasploit Project
- Nmap
- ZMap (software)
