= ManTech International =

American defense company

MANTECH
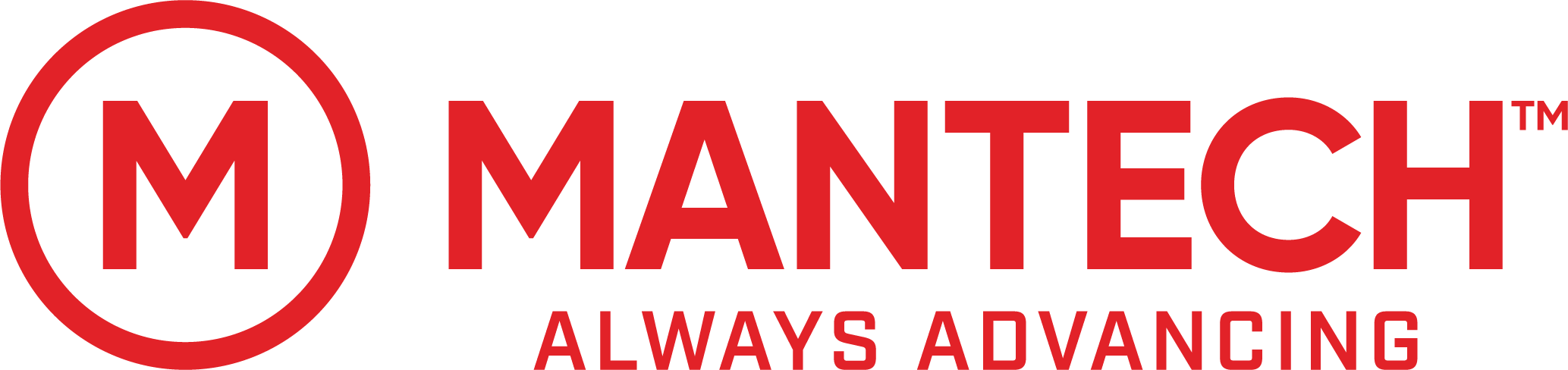
- Type: Private
- Traded as: Nasdaq: MANT (2002–2022)
- Industry: National security, Defense, Professional services
- Founded: 1968; 58 years ago in Livingston, New Jersey, U.S.
- Founders: Franc Wertheimer; George J. Pedersen
- Headquarters: Herndon, Virginia, U.S.
- Area served: Worldwide
- Key people: Kevin Phillips (chairman); Matt Tait (CEO)
- Revenue: ▲US$2.55 billion (2021)
- Operating income: ▲US$187 million (2021)
- Net income: ▲US$137 million (2021)
- Total assets: ▲US$2.64 billion (2021)
- Total equity: ▲US$1.68 billion (2021)
- Owner: The Carlyle Group
- Number of employees: c. 9,800 (December 2021)
- Subsidiaries: HBGary
- Website: ManTech.com

MANTECH is an American defense contracting firm based in Herndon, Virginia. It was co-founded in 1968 by Franc Wertheimer and George J. Pedersen. The company uses technology to help government and industry clients.

== History ==
MANTECH was founded in New Jersey by Franc Wertheimer and George J. Pedersen in 1968. The company name "MANTECH" is a portmanteau formed through the combination of "management" and "technology."

The company went public through an initial public offering in February 2002.

MANTECH customers include the United States Intelligence Community, Departments of Defense, State, Homeland Security, Energy, Justice, Veterans Affairs, Health and Human Services, and the Space Community. The firm specializes in cybersecurity; software and systems development; enterprise information technology; intelligence & counterintelligence; command, control, communications, computers, intelligence, surveillance, and reconnaissance (C4ISR); program protection and mission assurance; systems engineering; supply chain management and logistics; test and evaluation (T&E); training; and management consulting. The firm has supported the telecommunications use in Operation Iraqi Freedom. MANTECH's corporate headquarters is located in Herndon, Virginia It also has offices in 19 U.S. states, and employees positioned in over 20 countries. The firm has over 7,000 employees and supports more than 50 U.S. government agencies and commercial customers on more than 1,000 contracts. Revenues increased from $431 million in 2001 to $1.96 billion in 2018.

In May 2022, MANTECH announced their agreement to be acquired by the private equity firm The Carlyle Group. The deal worth $3.9 billion, will include the firm to buyout shares at $96 a share, representing a 32% premium to MANTECH's closing price on February 2, 2022.

== Acquisitions ==
On November 1, 2021, MANTECH announced that it has signed a definitive agreement to acquire @Gryphon Technologies, a systems engineering firm, for $350 million. The acquisition bolstered the company’s capabilities in models-based systems engineering, cyber security, strategic communication, readiness and sustainment support.

On April 1, 2019, MANTECH completed the acquisition of Kforce Government Solutions (KGS) for $115 million.

On October 2, 2017, MANTECH completed the acquisition of InfoZen, an IT service company.

On December 19, 2016, MANTECH acquired Edaptive Systems LLC, a provider of IT primarily to federal health agencies, with a focus on the Centers for Medicare and Medicaid Services.

On June 13, 2016, MANTECH acquired Oceans Edge, Inc.'s cyber business, a provider of cyber network operations (CNO) services.

On June 16, 2015, MANTECH completed the acquisition of Knowledge Consulting Group (KCG), a cyber security advisor focused on anticipating threats and implementing defensive countermeasures.

On April 28, 2015, MANTECH completed the acquisition of Welkin Associates, Ltd., formerly a wholly owned subsidiary of CSC.

On May 27, 2014, MANTECH completed the acquisition of 7Delta, Inc., a company performing applications and software development, program management, systems integration, information assurance, and security architecture services primarily within the healthcare community at the Department of Veterans Affairs (VA).

On February 19, 2014, MANTECH completed the acquisition of Allied Technology Group, Inc., an engineering and information management company with strategic contracts with the Department of Homeland Security (DHS).

On January 9, 2013, MANTECH completed the acquisition of ALTA Systems, Inc. of Fairfax, Virginia, an Information Technology (IT) and professional services company with applications in healthcare systems and capital planning.

On February 29, 2012, MANTECH announced its purchase of HBGary, Inc. Financial terms of the acquisition were not disclosed other than to say it was an "asset purchase", which excludes legal and financial liabilities.

On May 11, 2007, MANTECH completed the acquisition of SRS Technologies, a provider of high-end, mission-critical, advanced technology systems engineering and command, control, communications, computers, intelligence, surveillance, and reconnaissance (C4ISR) services and solutions.

== Notable contracts ==
The firm supports critical and national security programs through more than 1,000 current contract vehicles, including IDIQs, fixed-price, cost-reimbursement, labor-hour, time-and-materials, and many others.

On October 30, 2018, MANTECH announced a 10-year contract with the U.S. Air Force Space Command (AFSPC) totaling $158 million to provide full-spectrum security services to protect mission-critical programs.

On September 5, 2018, MANTECH announced a $668 million GSA FEDSIM award to support the Department of Homeland Security’s Continuous Diagnostics and Mitigation (CDM) Dynamic and Evolving Federal Enterprise Network Defense (DEFEND) program.

On July 12, 2018, MANTECH announced the award of a $959 million managed services contract to provide Enterprise IT solutions for a Department of Defense agency.

On January 30, 2018 MANTECH announced a $133 million award from the U.S. Army Intelligence & Security Command to support INSCOM's mission of counter-intelligence and counter-terrorism throughout the world.

On November 30, 2017, The U.S. Army has awarded MANTECH an $847 million task order for Vehicle Engineering Maintenance and Operations Support (VEMOS). This effort was awarded under the GSA OASIS MA-IDIQ and will be managed by FEDSIM. Under the 5-year agreement, MANTECH will provide a wide range of sustainment support services (operational engineering and logistics support) globally for some 25,000 vehicles including the Army's Mine-Resistant Ambush Protected vehicles, or MRAPs.

On November 27, 2017, MANTECH announced an $816 million contract with the U.S. Department of State to provide wide-ranging electronic and physical security countermeasure programs that will safeguard personnel supporting State's mission, both overseas and domestic.

On August 14, 2017, MANTECH was awarded a $180 million contract, with full potential value of $450 million including contract extensions over a 10-year term, to manage and transform NASA's Jet Propulsion Laboratory (JPL) Institutional Computing Environment (ICE). The agreement is a subcontract for ICE under JPL's NASA prime contract.

On August 1, 2017, The Defense Advanced Research Projects Agency (DARPA) Strategic Technologies Office (STO) has awarded MANTECH a multi-year award IDIQ contract with a total ceiling value of $200 million to provide support for DARPA's Scientific, Engineering, and Technical Assistance program.

On July 25, 2017, MANTECH announced an $80.3 million contract with the U.S. Naval Air Systems Command Naval Air Warfare Center Aircraft Division (NAWCAD) to support air warfare and related capability development activities of the Mission and Engineering and Analysis Department based in Patuxent River, Maryland.

On April 26, 2017, MANTECH announced a $229 million EAGLE II Task Order to provide business intelligence support to the U.S. Department of Homeland Security (DHS), Customs and Border Protection (CBP), Office of Information and Technology (OIT). CBP's mission is to safeguard America's borders, thereby protecting the public from dangerous people and materials while enabling legitimate travel and trade. The OIT supports the overall CBP mission by providing solutions that aid inspection and enforcement activities to safeguard the United States.

On April 25, 2017, the Federal Bureau of Investigation (FBI) awarded MANTECH a $220 million contract to provide enterprise IT infrastructure support to the FBI's Criminal Justice Information Services (CJIS) division. CJIS equips law enforcement, national security, and the Intelligence Community with the criminal data and information systems needed to protect the United States, while preserving civil liberties.

On February 16, 2017, the U.S. Army Communications and Electronics Command (CECOM) Software Engineering Center (SEC) awarded MANTECH a Software and Systems Engineering Services Next Generation prime contract to provide worldwide systems field and software support for the Army's intelligence and C3/LOG-IT systems. The cost-plus-fixed-fee task order has a 12-month base period of performance and two 12-month option periods, with a potential total value to MANTECH of $152 million.

On November 17, 2016, The National Geospatial-Intelligence Agency (NGA) awarded MANTECH a contract to provide information technology enterprise management services (ITEMS) and enterprise management/cyber security services (EM/CSS). The firm-fixed-price contract has 1 base year and 4 option years, with a potential value of $322 million.

On August 23, 2016, The Department of Homeland Security (DHS) awarded MANTECH a prime contract to develop a joint service-oriented architecture prototype integrating operational data for real-time situational awareness to enhance border security. Work will be performed in various locations across the United States and at the U.S. Customs and Border Protection headquarters in Washington, D.C., with an estimated completion date of March 10, 2019. The cost-plus-fixed-fee task order has a 12-month base period of performance and two 12-month option periods, with a potential total value to MANTECH of $24 million.

On August 18, 2016, The Defense Technical Information Center, under its Defense Systems Technical Area Tasks vehicle, has awarded MANTECH a prime task order to provide research, engineering, science, technology, rapid prototyping, development, advisory, and integration services in support of Marine Corps Intelligence, Surveillance, and Reconnaissance Enterprise (MCISRE) strategic, operational, and tactical intelligence objectives. The cost-plus-fixed-fee task order has a 5-year period of performance, with a potential total value to MANTECH of $208 million.

On August 10, 2016, The General Services Administration Federal Acquisition Service (GSA FAS) has awarded MANTECH two task orders on behalf of the U.S. Department of Homeland Security (DHS) to provide cybersecurity and cloud solutions to combat cyber threats, with a potential total value to MANTECH of $110 million.

On June 9, 2016, The Space and Naval Warfare Systems Center (SPAWARSYSCEN) Atlantic has awarded MANTECH a task order to provide engineering support on behalf of the U.S. Naval Observatory (USNO). The cost-plus-fixed-fee task order has a 12-month base period of performance and two 12-month option periods, with a potential total value to MANTECH of $34 million.

On June 7, 2016, The Missile Defense Agency (MDA) has awarded MANTECH a contract to provide technical, engineering, advisory, and management support and counterintelligence advisory and assistance services. This cost-plus-fixed-fee contract has two base years and three 1-year options with a value of approximately $32 million.

On May 16, 2016, The U.S. Department of Defense (DoD) awarded MANTECH a prime contract to provide operational and user maintenance (O&uM) and software maintenance support to the Product Manager (PM) Joint Personnel Identification (JPI) Quick Reaction Capabilities (QRC) Sustainment. The PM JPI is responsible for ensuring the QRC task order supports warfighter needs by sustaining adequate O&uM and software maintenance functions required on a daily basis. The QRC requirement includes both hardware (devices) and software that are used for biometrics collection, storage, matching, and analysis in a forward operating environment. The cost-plus-fixed-fee task order has a 12-month base period of performance and one 12-month option period, with a potential total value to MANTECH of $44.2 million.

On April 12, 2016, The Battlefield Information Collection and Exploitation Systems (BICES) Program Office awarded MANTECH a prime GSA OASIS task order to provide Systems Engineering and Technical Assessment and subject matter expertise. This effort involves extensive coordination with the Combatant Commands, Services, and members of the Intelligence Community (IC) to provide intelligence support to operations. The firm-fixed price task order has a 12-month base period of performance and four 12-month option periods, with a potential total value to MANTECH of $33 million.

On February 12, 2016, the Combating Terrorism Technical Support Office (CTTSO) awarded MANTECH a prime contract to provide contractor advisory and assistance and systems engineering and technical assistance. The cost-plus-fixed-fee task order has a 12-month base period of performance and four 12-month option periods, with a potential total value to MANTECH of $71 million.

On January 12, 2016, MANTECH awarded a contract by the Department of Defense to support the defense and Intelligence Community's growing needs for modernization. MANTECH will provide integration, systems engineering, sustainment, and deployment support worldwide. The award is for a base period of 1 year, followed by 4 option years. The total projected value is more than $200 million.

On December 3, 2015, MANTECH was awarded a contract by the United States Air Force to provide full-spectrum security services to protect mission-critical programs. The cost-plus contract has a 1-year base period and 9 option years, valued at $407 million.

On October 8, 2015, The Defense Intelligence Agency (DIA) awarded MANTECH an Enhanced Solutions for Information Technology Enterprise (E-SITE) contract to provide worldwide coverage for IT requirements and technical support services for DIA and other members of the Intelligence Community (IC). This multiple-award, indefinite delivery, indefinite quantity (IDIQ) vehicle has a 5-year period of performance, with a potential value of $6 billion.

== See also ==
- Top 100 US Federal Contractors - over $1.0 billion in FY15
