= George J. Pedersen =

American defense contractor and billionaire (1935–2023)

- Born: August 18, 1935; Staten Island
- Died: May 22, 2023 (aged 87)
- Occupation: Industrialist
- Spouse: Marylyn Pedersen
- Children: 3
- Relatives: Chris Lancaster (daughter); Jenny Warren (daughter); Maggie Pedersen (daughter)

George J. Pedersen (1935–2023) was an American billionaire and co-founder of the defense and intelligence contractor, ManTech International. He is known as a government contracting pioneer.

In 2023, his net worth was estimated at $1.3 billion.

== Biography ==
Pedersen was born on August 18, 1935, in Staten Island. He made his fortune after founding ManTech International with one single contract with the US Navy. It was reported that the company was contracted to build war-game models. ManTech, which was co-founded with Franc Wertheimer, employed 16 employees upon inception.

Since the company's foundation, Pedersen was the Chairman of its Board of Directors until he stepped down in 2020. He also served as CEO for almost five decades until his retirement in 2017. Under his tenure, ManTech started trading on the Nasdaq in 2002, when the company reached $400 million in annual revenue.

From 2018 to 2020, Pedersen was also ManTech's Executive Chairman. He retired in 2022 on the heels of reports he was considering the sale of his controlling stake in the company. In 2022, Pedersen and his family voted to approve the sale of ManTech to The Carlyle Group.

Pedersen is a recipient of NDIA's James Forrestal Industry Leadership Award.

Pedersen died on May 22, 2023.
