= Nessus (software) =

Computer security software

Nessus Vulnerability Scanner
- Developer: Tenable, Inc.
- Stable release: 10.12.4 / August 19, 2026; 22 days ago
- Operating system: Linux, macOS and Microsoft Windows
- Type: Vulnerability scanner
- License: Proprietary; GPL (2.2.11 and earlier)
- Website: www.tenable.com

Nessus is a proprietary vulnerability scanner developed by Tenable, Inc.

== History ==
In 1998 Renaud Deraison created The Nessus Project as a free remote security scanner. On October 5 2005, with the release of Nessus 3, the project changed from the GNU General Public License to a proprietary license.

The Nessus 2 engine and some of the plugins are still using the GNU General Public License, leading to forks based on Nessus like OpenVAS and Greenbone Sustainable Resilience.

== See also ==
- Metasploit Project
- OpenVAS
- Security Administrator Tool for Analyzing Networks (SATAN)
- SAINT (software)
- Snort (software)
- Wireshark
