= Information Systems Security Association =

- Type: 501(c)(6)
- Tax ID no.: 32-0378586
- Headquarters: Woburn, MA
- Website: www.issa.org

Information Systems Security Association (ISSA) is a not-for-profit, international professional organization of information security professionals and practitioners. It was founded in 1984 after work on its establishment started in 1982. ISSA promotes the sharing of information security management practices through educational forums, publications and networking opportunities among security professionals.

ISSA members and award winners include many of the industry’s notable luminaries and represent a wide range of industries – from communications, education, healthcare, manufacturing, financial and consulting to IT as well as federal, state and local government departments and agencies.

The association publishes the ISSA Journal, a peer-reviewed publication on the issues and trends of the industry. It also partners with ESG (Enterprise Strategy Group) to release a yearly research report, "The Life and Times of the Cyber Security Professional", to examine the experiences of cybersecurity professionals as they navigate the modern threat landscape and the effects it has on their careers.

== Organization ==
Information Systems Security Association has a board of directors that is elected annually by its members and a set of committees that are appointed. The headquarters of ISSA is located in Houston, Texas.

ISSA International Board of Directors Executive Officers

President: Jimmy Sanders

Vice President: Deb Peinert, CISSP-ISSMP

Secretary/Director of Operations: Lee Neely

Treasurer/Chief Financial Officer: David Vaughn

== Membership ==
ISSA has an international membership base.

== Goals ==
The primary goal of the ISSA is to promote management practices that will ensure the confidentiality, integrity and availability of information resources. The ISSA facilitates interaction and education to create a more successful environment for global information systems security and for the professionals involved. ISSA's goals are to promote security education and skills development, encourage free information exchanges, communicate current events within the security industry and help express the importance of security controls to enterprise business management.

== Code of ethics ==
As an applicant for membership, the individual is expected to be bounded to a principle of ethics related to the Information Security career.

Applicants for ISSA membership attest that they have and will:

- Perform all professional activities and duties in accordance with all applicable laws and the highest ethical principles;
- Promote generally accepted information security current best practices and standards;
- Maintain appropriate confidentiality of proprietary or otherwise sensitive information encountered in the course of professional activities;
- Discharge professional responsibilities with diligence and honesty;
- Refrain from any activities which might constitute a conflict of interest or otherwise damage the reputation of employers, the information security profession, or the Association; and
- Not intentionally injure or impugn the professional reputation or practice of colleagues, clients, or employers.

== International presence ==
ISSA is present in more than one hundred countries, including Europe and Asia, with more than 10,000 members.

== See also ==
- ISACA
- Business network
- Computer security
- Information Security
- Information security management system
- IT risk
