= Vulnerability scanner =

Probes computer systems for known security problems

A vulnerability scanner is a computer program designed to assess computers, networks or applications for known weaknesses. These scanners are used to discover the weaknesses of a given system. They are used in the identification and detection of vulnerabilities arising from mis-configurations or flawed programming within a network-based asset such as a firewall, router, web server, application server, etc. Modern vulnerability scanners allow for both authenticated and unauthenticated scans. Modern scanners are typically available as SaaS (Software as a Service); provided over the internet and delivered as a web application. The modern vulnerability scanner often has the ability to customize vulnerability reports as well as the installed software, open ports, certificates and other host information that can be queried as part of its workflow.

- Authenticated scans allow for the scanner to directly access network based assets using remote administrative protocols such as secure shell (SSH) or remote desktop protocol (RDP) and authenticate using provided system credentials. This allows the vulnerability scanner to access low-level data, such as specific services and configuration details of the host operating system. It's then able to provide detailed and accurate information about the operating system and installed software, including configuration issues and missing security patches.
- Unauthenticated scans is a method that can result in a high number of false positives and is unable to provide detailed information about the asset's operating system and installed software. This method is typically used by threat actors or security analysts trying to determine the security posture of externally accessible assets.

Vulnerability scanners should be able to detect the risks in open-source dependencies. However, since developers will usually re-bundle the OSS, the same code will appear in different dependencies, which will then impact the performance and ability of scanners to detect the vulnerable OSS.

The CIS Critical Security Controls for Effective Cyber Defense designates continuous vulnerability scanning as a critical control for effective cyber defense.

Part of a server log, showing attempts by a scanner to find the administration page.

220.128.235.XXX - - [26/Aug/2010:03:00:09 +0200] "GET /db/db/main.php HTTP/1.0" 404 - "-" "-"
220.128.235.XXX - - [26/Aug/2010:03:00:09 +0200] "GET /db/myadmin/main.php HTTP/1.0" 404 - "-" "-"
220.128.235.XXX - - [26/Aug/2010:03:00:10 +0200] "GET /db/webadmin/main.php HTTP/1.0" 404 - "-" "-"
220.128.235.XXX - - [26/Aug/2010:03:00:10 +0200] "GET /db/dbweb/main.php HTTP/1.0" 404 - "-" "-"
220.128.235.XXX - - [26/Aug/2010:03:00:11 +0200] "GET /db/websql/main.php HTTP/1.0" 404 - "-" "-"
220.128.235.XXX - - [26/Aug/2010:03:00:11 +0200] "GET /db/webdb/main.php HTTP/1.0" 404 - "-" "-"
220.128.235.XXX - - [26/Aug/2010:03:00:13 +0200] "GET /db/dbadmin/main.php HTTP/1.0" 404 - "-" "-"
220.128.235.XXX - - [26/Aug/2010:03:00:13 +0200] "GET /db/db-admin/main.php HTTP/1.0" 404 - "-" "-"
 (..)

== See also ==
- Cybersecurity
- Browser security
- Computer emergency response team
- Information security
- Internet security
- Mobile security
- Dynamic application security testing
- Penetration testing
- Pentesting software toolkits
  ◦ OpenVAS
  ◦ Nessus
  ◦ Metasploit Project
  ◦ Snort
  ◦ garak
- Grype
