= Dradis Framework =

Open-source security testing tool

- Developer: The Dradis Framework community
- Release: 2007
- Stable release: 4.18.0 / October 2, 2025; 13 months ago
- Written in: Ruby, Ruby on Rails
- Operating system: Cross-platform
- Type: Penetration test tool
- License: GPLv2
- Website: dradis.com
- Repository: github.com/dradis/dradis-ce

Dradis Framework is an open-source web application designed for security testing teams to consolidate notes, findings and evidence from penetration testing and vulnerability assessments.

== History ==
Dradis Framework was first released in 2007, and was created to address the challenge of consolidating information from multiple tools and testers during security engagements. The framework's development is community-driven and open-source.

An XSS vulnerability in the framework was documented in 2019.

== Usage ==
Dradis is primarily used by penetration testers and security assessment teams.

Teams import results from security tools like Nmap, Burp Suite, and Nessus, and the data is then used for analysis, from which the framework outputs a report.

The framework can be used and integrated with Kali Linux, a Linux distribution used for penetration testing.

== Reception ==
The framework is featured in multiple academic syllabi, such as the CompTIA PenTest+ certification and in information security degrees.

The tool has been featured in multiple textbooks and papers on penetration testing and ethical hacking.

== See also ==
- Metasploit Project
- Kali Linux
- Penetration test
- Vulnerability assessment
- Nmap
- Burp Suite
- Nessus (software)
- OWASP
