= List of security assessment tools =

This is a list of available software and hardware tools that are designed for or are particularly suited to various kinds of security assessment and security testing.

== Operating systems and tool suites ==
Several operating systems and tool suites provide bundles of tools useful for various types of security assessment.

=== Operating system distributions ===
- Kali Linux (formerly BackTrack), a penetration-test-focused Linux distribution based on Debian
- Pentoo, a penetration-test-focused Linux distribution based on Gentoo
- ParrotOS, a Linux distro focused on penetration testing, forensics, and online anonymity.

== Tools ==
Tool	Vendor	Type	License	Tasks	Commercial status
Aircrack-ng			GPL	Packet sniffer and injector; WEP encryption key recovery	Free
Metasploit	Rapid7	application, framework	EULA	Vulnerability scanning, vulnerability development	Multiple editions with various licensing terms, including one free-of-charge.
Nessus	Tenable Network Security		Proprietary; GPL (2.2.11 and earlier)	Vulnerability scanner	
Nmap		terminal application	GPL v2	computer security, network management	Free
OpenVAS			GPL		
Nikto Web Scanner			GPL		
SQLmap					
Wireshark	Riverbed Technology (sponsor)	desktop application	GPL2	Network sniffing, traffic analysis	Free. also offers limited vendor support, professional tools, and hardware for a fee
Grype	Anchore	command-line tool	Apache License 2.0	Vulnerability scanning	Free
