= BackBox =

Security-oriented Linux distribution

BackBox Linux
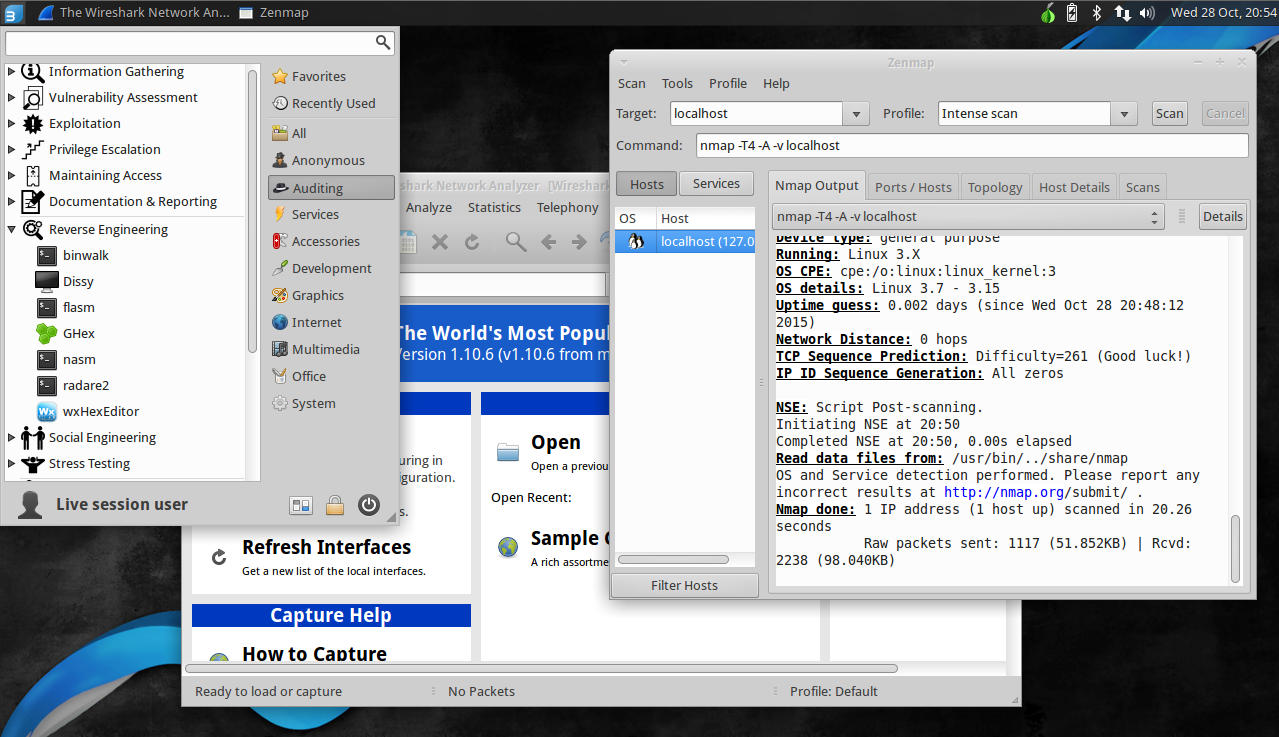
- Developer: BackBox Team
- OS family: Unix-like (Linux kernel)
- Working state: Active
- Source model: Open source
- Latest release: 9 / October 30, 2024
- Supported platforms: i386(x86), amd64(x86-64)
- Kernel type: Linux
- Default user interface: XFCE
- License: Free software licenses (mainly GPL)
- Official website: www.backbox.org

BackBox is a penetration test and security assessment oriented Ubuntu-based Linux distribution providing a network and information systems analysis toolkit. It includes a complete set of tools required for ethical hacking and security testing.

== Contents ==
BackBox was designed with consideration of customisation and system performance. It uses the light window manager Xfce, which contributes to its relatively low resource usage. It also has an assistive community behind it.

It includes commonly used security and analysis Linux tools, aiming for a wide spread of goals, including web application analysis, network analysis, stress testing, sniffing, vulnerability assessment, computer forensic analysis and exploitation, and other tools.

Part of the significance of this distribution comes from its Launchpad repository core, frequently updated to the latest stable version of the most known and used ethical hacking tools. The integration and development of new tools in the distribution follows the open source community, particularly the Debian Free Software Guidelines criteria.

== Releases ==
Date	Release
Sep 9, 2010	BackBox Linux RC
Sep 3, 2011	BackBox Linux 2
Jan 2, 2012	BackBox Linux 2.01
Apr 24, 2012	BackBox Linux 2.05
Oct 24, 2012	BackBox Linux 3.0
Jan 23, 2013	BackBox Linux 3.01
May 23, 2013	BackBox Linux 3.05
Sep 20, 2013	BackBox Linux 3.09
Jan 16, 2014	BackBox Linux 3.13
Oct 11, 2014	BackBox Linux 4.0
Jan 29, 2015	BackBox Linux 4.1
Apr 27, 2015	BackBox Linux 4.2
Jul 20, 2015	BackBox Linux 4.3
Oct 12, 2015	BackBox Linux 4.4
Jan 27, 2016	BackBox Linux 4.5
Mar 08, 2016	BackBox Linux 4.5.1
May 26, 2016	BackBox Linux 4.6
December 8, 2016	BackBox Linux 4.7
July 21, 2017	BackBox Linux 5
March 9, 2018	BackBox Linux 5.1
August 9, 2018	BackBox Linux 5.2
February 18, 2019	BackBox Linux 5.3
June 11, 2019	BackBox Linux 6
May 15, 2020	BackBox Linux 7
November 15, 2022	BackBox Linux 8
November 9, 2023	BackBox Linux 8.1
October 30, 2024	BackBox Linux 9

== Categories ==
BackBox Linux categories listed as follow:

- Information Gathering
- Vulnerability Assessment
- Exploitation
- Privilege Escalation
- Maintaining Access
- Documentation & Reporting
- Reverse Engineering
- Social Engineering
- Forensic Analysis
- VoIP Analysis
- Wireless Analysis
- Miscellaneous

== Tools ==
More than 70 tools are included in BackBox:

- Metasploit
- Armitage
- Nmap
- OpenVAS
- W3af
- The Social Engineering Toolkit
- Ettercap
- Scapy
- Wireshark
- Kismet
- Aircrack
- Ophcrack
- Sqlmap
- John The Ripper
