= Offensive Security =

American international information security company

- Formerly: Offensive Security Services, LLC
- Type: For-profit private company
- Industry: Cybersecurity; Information Security; Computer software
- Founders: Mati Aharoni, Devon Kearns
- Headquarters: New York City, United States
- Area served: International
- Key people: Ning Wang, CEO
- Products: Kali Linux; Kali NetHunter; ExploitDB; Offensive Security Certified Professional
- Website: www.offsec.com

Offensive Security (also known as OffSec) is an American for-profit international private company working in information security, penetration testing and digital forensics. Beginning around 2007, the company created open source projects, advanced security courses, the ExploitDB vulnerability database, and the Kali Linux distribution. OffSec was started by Mati Aharoni, and employs security professionals with experience in security penetration testing and system security evaluation. The company has provided security counseling and training to many technology companies.

OffSec also provides cybersecurity training courses and certifications, such as the Offensive Security Certified Professional (OSCP).

== History ==
Mati Aharoni, Offensive Security's co-founder, started the business around 2006 with his wife Iris. Offensive Security LLC was formed in 2008. In September 2019 the company received its first venture capital investment, from Spectrum Equity, and CEO Ning Wang replaced Joe Steinbach, the previous CEO for four years, who ran the business from the Philippines. Jim O’Gorman, the company's chief strategy officer, also gives training and writes books. Customers include Cisco, Wells Fargo, Booz Allen Hamilton, and defense-related U.S. government agencies. The company gives training sessions at the annual Black Hat hacker conference.

In 2019, J.M. Porup of CSO online wrote "few infosec certifications have developed the prestige in recent years of the Offensive Security Certified Professional (OSCP)," and said it has "a reputation for being one of the most difficult," because it requires student to hack into a test network during a difficult "24-hour exam." He also summarized accusations of cheating, and Offensive Security's responses, concluding hiring based only on credentials was a mistake, and an applicants skills should be validated.

== Projects ==
In addition to their training and security services, the company also founded open source projects, online exploit databases and security information teaching aids.

=== Kali Linux ===
The company is known for developing Kali Linux, which is a Debian Linux based distribution modeled after BackTrack. It succeeds BackTrack Linux, and is designed for security information needs, such as penetration testing and digital forensics. Kali NetHunter is Offensive Security's project for the ARM architecture and Android devices. Kali Linux contains over 600 security programs. The release of the second version (2.0) received a wide coverage in the digital media Offensive Security provides a book, Kali Linux Revealed, and makes the first edition available for free download. Users and employees have been inspired to have careers in social engineering. In 2019, in a detailed review, Cyberpunk called Offensive Security's Kali Linux, "formally [sic] known as BackTrack," the "best penetration testing distribution."

=== BackTrack ===
BackTrack Linux was an open source GNU General Public License Linux distribution developed by programmers from around the world with assistance, coordination, and funding from Offensive Security. The distribution was originally developed under the names Whoppix, IWHAX, and Auditor. It was designed to delete any trace of its usage. The distribution was widely known and used by security experts.

=== ExploitDB ===
Exploit Database is an archive of vulnerable software and exploits that have been made public by the information security community. The database is designed to help penetration testers test small projects easily by sharing information with each other. The database also contains proof-of-concepts, helping information security professionals learn new exploit variations. In Ethical Hacking and Penetration Testing Guide, Rafay Baloch said Exploit-db had over 20,000 exploits, and was available in BackTrack Linux by default. In CEH v10 Certified Ethical Hacker Study Guide, Ric Messier called exploit-db a "great resource," and stated it was available within Kali Linux by default, or could be added to other Linux distributions.

=== Metasploit ===
Metasploit Unleashed is a charity project created by Offensive Security for the sake of Hackers for Charity, which was started by Johnny Long. The projects teaches Metasploit and is designed especially for people who consider starting a career in penetration testing.

=== Google Hacking Database ===
Google Hacking Database was created by Johnny Long and is now hosted by Offensive Security. The project was created as a part of Hackers for Charity. The database helps security professionals determine whether a given application or website is compromised. The database uses Google search to establish whether usernames and passwords had been compromised.

== See also ==
- Offensive Security Certified Professional
- Kali NetHunter
- BackTrack Linux
- List of computer security certifications
