= Uzimon =

- Born: Daniel Douglas Frith; Hamilton, Bermuda
- Origin: Bermuda
- Genres: reggae, reggae fusion, soca
- Years active: 2008–present
- Label: Volcanic Productions

Uzimon is a musical dancehall/reggae comedic satire persona of Daniel Frith, a Broadway and television actor, musician, and educator originally from Bermuda. He is probably best known internationally for his song "Steven Seagal 2.0", which was featured on the front page of The Pirate Bay for an extended period, garnering the video viral status.

Uzimon began as a dancehall-parody project in 2007, as Frith mentioned in an interview with Brooklyn Magazine, as a satirical response to a tidal wave of “a whole bunch of white dudes who think that they can also make it as dancehall artists. It was almost like, ‘what if we pretended to be another one of those white guys?. And we put out a couple of mysterious videos of a buffoon saying his album was gonna come out, make people think that there’s this guy that thinks he’s the greatest and he’s totally deluded.” The act began as underground cult act but evolved into more of a serious stage act with a full live band, known for its dedication to the authentic reggae sound, and theatrical stage antics. Most recently Uzimon headlined on the Lion's Den Mainstage at Boomtown, one of the biggest festivals in Europe, along other acts such as The Wailers, Chronixx, Shaggy, and Easy Star Allstars. He recently performed onstage live with Major Lazer at the one-life one love festival in Bermuda. He has billed and performed with such artists as Ziggy Marley, Maxi Priest, Beres Hammond, Collie Buddz, The Slackers, Langhorne Slim, and Hollie Cook. Largeup.com, the premier tastemaker for dancehall music calls Uzimon's work, "A masterstroke. Genius."

His 2011 album, Showdown was produced by Brett Tubin of Channel Tubes Records and features work from members of John Brown's body and instrumental and production work from the musician and producer Ticklah.

He is also known for singing "Call OffSec" and "Try Harder 2.0", both songs produced by the renowned cyber-security firm Offensive Security Ltd (developers of the BackTrack/Kali Linux security suites, and the OSCP hacking certification).

In 2013, he signed with the UK's Boom Artist's Agency, and is also a regular special guest crowd favorite at Webster Hall's weekly party, BASSment Saturdays. He has also been involved in acting, receiving a part in the NBC's crime series, Law and Order - Special Victims Unit.

In 2014, a collaboration between Uzimon, Coolio, Adil Omar and members of D12 was featured in Vice Magazine's Noisey.

In 2021, the song "McDojo Life" was created for the YouTube channel of the same name, keeping with the channel's topic of exposing fraudulent martial artists.
