= Kali NetHunter =

Mobile penetration testing platform for Android devices

- Developer: Offensive Security
- Release: 24 September 2014; 12 years ago
- Stable release: 2024.3 / 11 September 2024; 2 years ago
- Preview release: 2024.4 / 11 September 2024; 2 years ago
- Written in: C, Java, Kotlin, Python, Bash
- Operating system: Android, LineageOS, Kali Linux
- Platform: armhf, aarch64
- License: Various
- Website: www.kali.org/docs/nethunter/
- Repository: gitlab.com/kalilinux/nethunter/

Kali NetHunter is a free and open-source mobile penetration testing platform for Android devices, based on Kali Linux. Kali NetHunter is available for non-rooted devices (NetHunter Rootless), for rooted devices that have a standard recovery (NetHunter Lite), and for rooted devices with custom recovery for which a NetHunter specific kernel is available (NetHunter). It was designed as a mobile penetration testing platform, is derived from Kali Linux’s original architecture and extends it to Android devices, providing tools and capabilities designed for mobile network security testing. Aharoni, Mati (2020). Kali Linux Revealed: Mastering the Penetration Testing Distribution. Offensive Security. Official images are published by Offensive Security on their download page and are updated every quarter. NetHunter images with custom kernels are published for the most popular supported devices, such as Google Nexus, Samsung Galaxy and OnePlus. Many more models are supported, and images not published by Offensive Security can be generated using NetHunter build scripts. Kali NetHunter is maintained by a community of volunteers, and is funded by Offensive Security.

== Background and history ==
Version 1.1 was released in January 2015 and added support for OnePlus devices & non-English keyboard layouts for HID attacks.

Version 1.2 was released in May 2015 and added support for Nexus 9 Android tablets.

Version 3.0 was released in January 2016 after a major rewrite of the application, installer, and kernel building framework. This version also introduced support for devices running Android Marshmallow.

Version 2019.2 was released in May 2019 and switched to kali-rolling as its Kali Linux container. It adopted the Kali Linux versioning and release cycle to reflect that change. With this release, the number of supported Android devices grew to over 50.

Version 2019.3 was released in September 2019 and introduced the NetHunter App Store as the default mechanism for deploying and updating apps.

Version 2019.4 was released in December 2019 and premiered the "Kali NetHunter Desktop Experience."

Before December 2019, Kali NetHunter was only available for selected Android devices. Installing Kali NetHunter required a device that:

- is rooted
- has a custom recovery
- had a kernel built especially for Kali NetHunter

In December 2019, "Kali NetHunter Lite" and "Kali NetHunter Rootless" editions were released to allow users of devices for which no NetHunter specific kernels were available, and users of devices that are not rooted, to install Kali NetHunter with a reduced set of functionality.

Version 2020.1 was released on 28 January 2020 and partitioned 3 NetHunter images; NetHunter Rootless, NetHunter Lite, NetHunter Full.

Version 2020.2 was released on 12 May 2020 and supported over 160 kernels and 64 devices.

Version 2020.3 was released on 18 August 2020 and added Bluetooth Arsenal (It combines a set of Bluetooth tools in the Kali NetHunter app with some pre-configured workflows and exciting use cases. You can use your external adapter for reconnaissance, spoofing, listening to and injecting audio into various devices, including speakers, headsets, watches, or even cars.) and supported Nokia 3.1 and Nokia 6.1 phones.

Version 2020.4 was released on 18 November 2020 and edited new NetHunter settings menu, added select from different boot animations, and persistent Magisk.

== Features ==
Kali NetHunter is an open-source Android penetration testing platform developed by Offensive Security, featuring capabilities like wireless 802.11 frame injection, one-click Evil Access Point setup, and Bad USB MITM attacks. "Kali NetHunter Official Page". Kali Linux. In addition to the penetration testing tools included with desktop Kali Linux, NetHunter also enables Wireless 802.11 frame injection, one-click MANA Evil Access Points, HID keyboard functionality (for Teensy-like attacks), as well as BadUSB man-in-the-middle /(MitM) attacks.

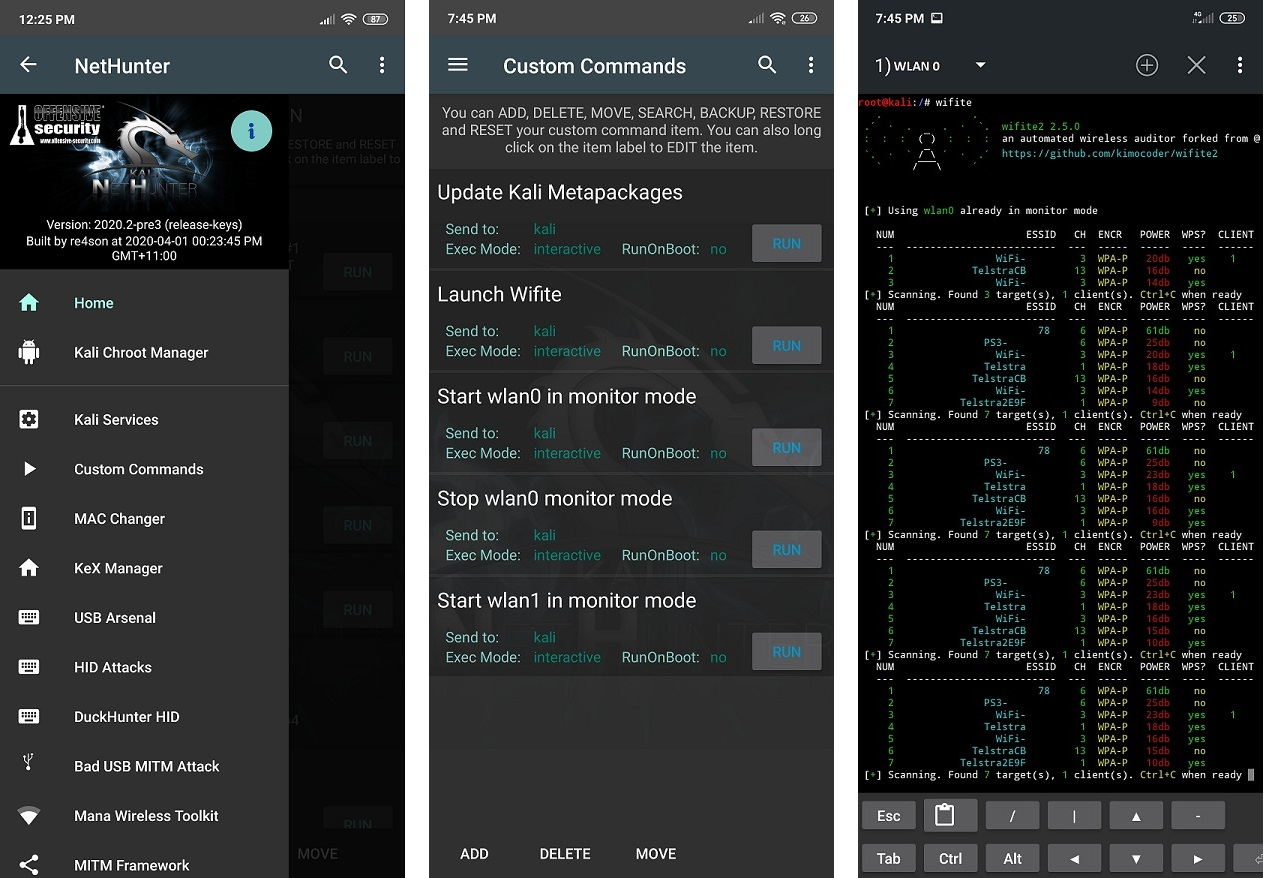
NetHunter App for advanced attack modes showcasing a wifi monitoring attack using the internal wlan0 interface

== NetHunter App Store ==
Kali NetHunter has an application store based on a fork of F-Droid with telemetry completely removed. The store has about 42 applications (2021).

== See also ==
- Kali Linux
- Offensive Security
- Offensive Security Certified Professional
