= WebScarab =

Web security tool

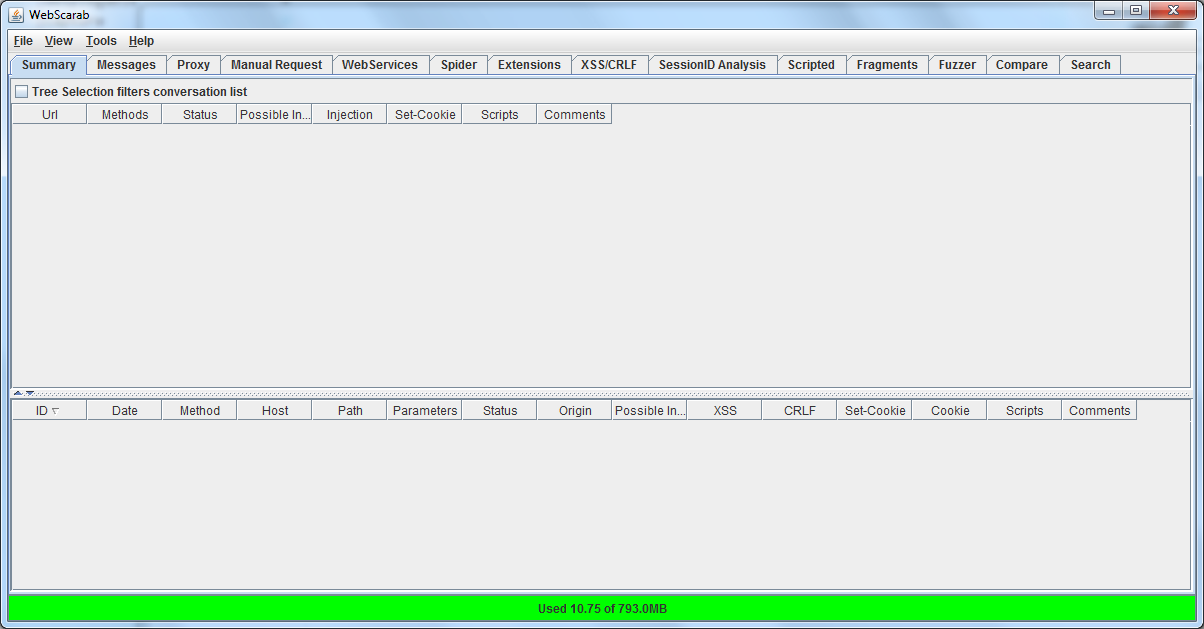
- Screenshot of WebScarab
- Developer: The Open Web Application Security Project
- Written in: Java
- Successor: Zed Attack Proxy
- Type: Web security testing tool
- License: GPLv2
- Website: WebScarab
- Repository: github.com/OWASP/OWASP-WebScarab

WebScarab is a web security application testing tool. It serves as a proxy that intercepts and allows people to alter web browser web requests (both HTTP and HTTPS) and web server replies. WebScarab also may record traffic for further review.

In 2013 official development of WebScarab slowed. The project repository was archived on 4 April 2024. The website of the project was also archived and recommends using OWASP's Zed Attack Proxy instead.

== Overview ==
WebScarab is an open source tool developed by The Open Web Application Security Project (OWASP), and was implemented in Java so it could run across multiple operating systems.

WebScarab is meant to act as a framework, being extensible and with most features being implemented as plugins.

=== Features ===
Some of the features provided by plugins include:

- An intercepting proxy server
- Executing Java commands with BeanShell
- Emulating a slower network
- Acting as a web crawler
- Fuzzing request parameters
- Cross-site scripting analysis
