= Scarab =

Scarab may refer to:

== Beetles ==
- Scarab (artifact), popular amulets and impression seals in Ancient Egypt
- Scarabaeidae, the family of over 30,000 species of beetles, often called scarabs or scarab beetles
  - Scarabaeus sacer, common name Sacred scarab, sacred to ancient Egyptians

== Arts, entertainment, and media ==
- Scarab (comics), a number of different comic book characters
- Scarab (video game), a 1997 first-person shooter
- Scarab, a fictional dinghy in Arthur Ransome's children's novel The Picts and the Martyrs
- "Scarab", a song by Northlane from Singularity, 2013
- "Scarabs", a song by Karnivool from Themata, 2005
- The Scarab, a fictional character from the adult animated series Fionna and Cake, 2023

== Businesses and organizations ==
- Scarab (constructor), defunct all-American sports car and open-wheel race car constructor
- Scarab (fraternity), an architectural fraternity at University of Illinois
- Scarab, the former name of the video game company feelplus
- Scarab Club, an artists' club, gallery, and studio in Detroit, Michigan, U.S.
- Scarab Productions, a film, television and new media production company
- Scarabbean Senior Society, an organization at the University of Tennessee whose members are called "scarabs"

== Places ==
- Scarab Bluff, Alexander Island, Antarctica
- Scarab Peak, Victoria Land, Antarctica

== Transportation ==
=== Aircraft ===
- RAE Scarab, a 1932 British light aircraft
- Teledyne Ryan Scarab, a jet-powered reconnaissance UAV developed in the United States in the 1980s for sale to Egypt
- Warner Scarab, an American seven-cylinder radial aircraft engine

=== Land vehicles and watercraft ===
- Scarab (boat), a brand of high performance power boats and fishing boats
- Scarab (rover), a 2010 robotic lunar rover prototype
- Scammell Scarab, a British 3-wheeled articulated lorry tractor unit produced 1948-1967
- Fiberfab Scarab STM (Sport Transport Module), an American 3-wheeled car
- Stout Scarab, a 1930–1940s American minivan
- Rover Scarab, a convertible
- Scarab compact road sweeper vehicle

== Other uses ==
- Currency sign (generic) ¤, sometimes known as scarab
- Scarab SS-21, NATO term for the Russian OTR-21 Tochka tactical ballistic missile
- "Scarab", a disc golf putter by Infinite Discs
- Scarab, a character in the animated series Adventure Time: Fionna and Cake

== See also ==
- Scarabaeus (video game)
- WebScarab
