= Cavirin =

Cybersecurity company

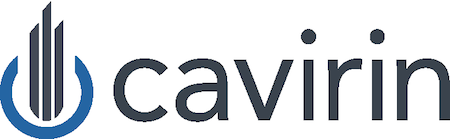
- Company type: Private
- Industry: Cloud Security
- Founded: 2012
- Headquarters: Santa Clara, Calif.
- Key people: Brajesh Goyal, VP Engineering; Nisha Agarwal, VP; GTM and Products
- Services: Risk Management
- Website: cavirin.com

Cavirin is a privately held cybersecurity company headquartered in Santa Clara, California.

Cavirin provides a cyber intelligence platform that delivers security management across physical, public and hybrid clouds. Cavirin addresses risk and compliance management through DevSecOps integrations.

Cavirin's platform is integrated with AWS, Microsoft Azure, Google Cloud Platform, VMware, KVM, and Docker.

== Company ==
Cavirin was founded in 2012 and maintains a single location in Santa Clara, California.

Cavirin has received multiple funding rounds from Japan-based information technology holding company SRA Holdings, Inc.

== See also ==
- Compliance
- Security Assessment
