= Parrot OS =

Debian-based Linux distribution

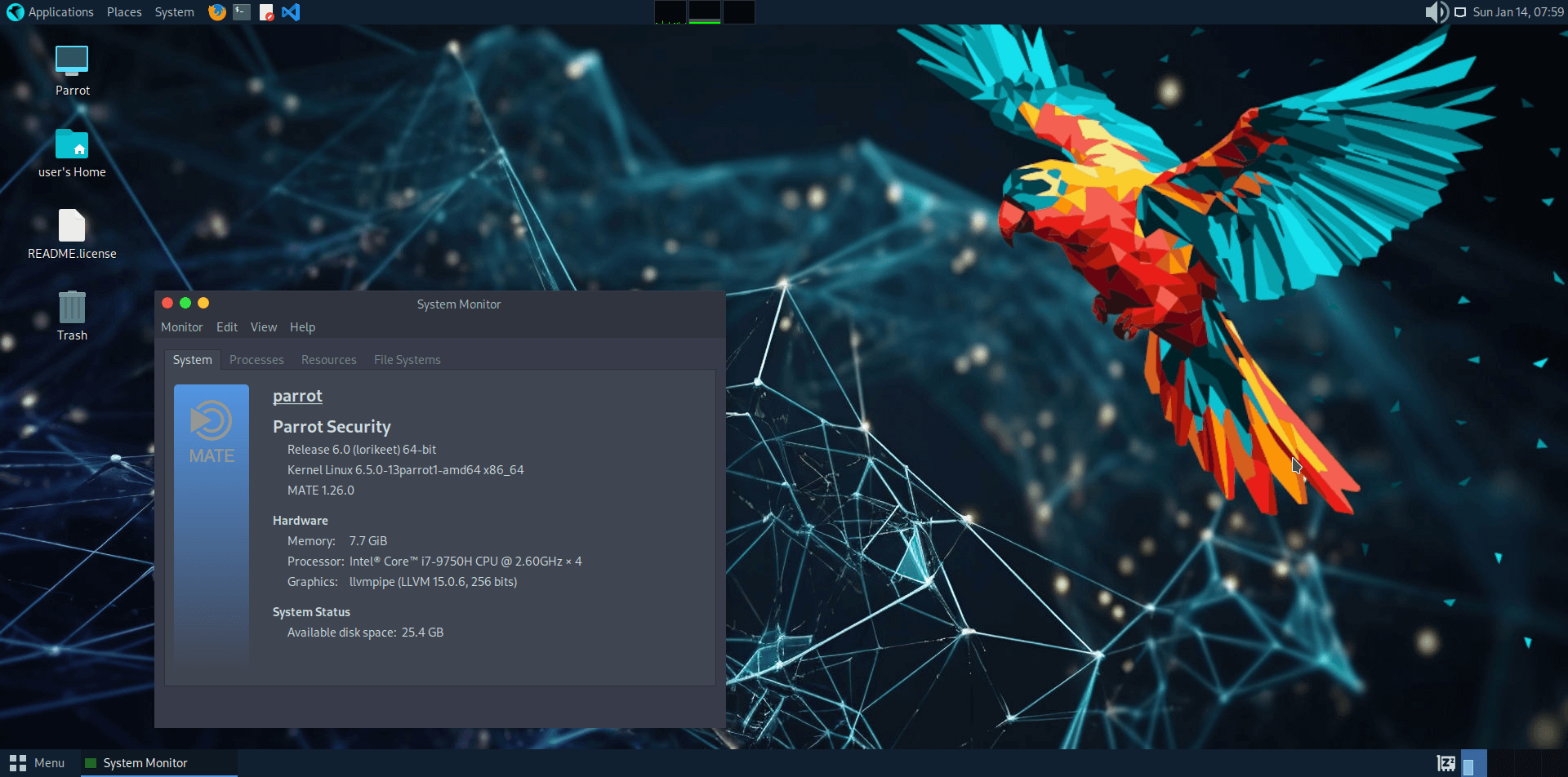
- Developer: Lorenzo "Palinuro" Faletra; Parrot Dev Team
- OS family: Linux (Unix-like)
- Working state: Current
- Source model: Open source
- Initial release: 10 April 2013
- Latest release: 7.4 "Echo" / October 3, 2026; 49 days ago
- Repository: gitlab.com/ParrotSec
- Update method: Long-term support
- Package manager: APT
- Supported platforms: amd64 (x86-64), ARM
- Kernel type: Monolithic
- Default user interface: MATE (Parrot OS 6 and earlier) KDE Plasma (Parrot OS 7)
- License: Free software, mainly the GNU GPL and Creative Commons
- Official website: parrotsec.org

Parrot OS is a Linux distribution based on Debian with a focus on security, privacy, and development.

== Core ==
Parrot is based on Debian's "stable" branch, with the Linux kernel based on upstream Debian's LTS kernel. The distro also follows a LTS development model in regards to package management.

The default desktop environment was MATE, and the default display manager was LightDM until Parrot OS 7.

The system is certified to run on devices which have a minimum of 256MB of RAM, and it is suitable for both 32-bit (i386) and 64-bit (amd64) processor architectures. Moreover, the project is available for ARMv7 (armhf) architectures.

In June 2017, the Parrot Team announced they were considering to change from Debian to Devuan, mainly because of problems with systemd.

As of 21 January 2019, the Parrot team has begun to phase out the development of their 32-bit (i386) ISO.

In August 2020 with Parrot OS 4.10, the Parrot OS team started supporting Xfce.

Since the release of Parrot OS 7 (based on Debian 13), the default desktop environment has switched to KDE Plasma.

== Editions ==
Parrot has multiple editions that are based upon Debian, with various desktop environments available.

=== Home Edition ===
Parrot OS Home Edition is the base edition of Parrot designed for daily use, and it targets regular users who need a secure system on their laptops or workstations.

The distribution is useful for daily work. Parrot Home also includes programs to chat privately with people, encrypt documents, or browse the internet anonymously. The system can also be used as a starting point to build a system with a custom set of security tools.

=== Security Edition ===
Parrot OS Security Edition is designed for penetration testing, vulnerability assessment and mitigation, computer forensics, and anonymous web browsing.

=== Parrot ARM ===
Parrot ARM is a lightweight Parrot release for embedded systems. It is currently available for Raspberry Pi devices.

=== Parrot Architect & IoT ===
ParrotOS with nothing pre-installed. It allows for any software and desktop environment chosen by the user.

== Parrot OS tools ==
There are multiple tools in Parrot OS which are specially designed for Security Researchers and are related to penetration testing. A few of them are listed below, more can be found on the official website.

=== Tor ===
Tor, also known as The Onion Router, is a distributed network that anonymizes Internet browsing. It is designed in a way that the IP address of the client using Tor is hidden from the server that the client is visiting. Also, the data and other details are hidden from the client’s Internet Service Provider (ISP). Tor network uses hops to encrypt the data between the client and the server. Tor network and Tor browser are pre-installed and configured in Parrot OS.

=== Onion Share ===
Onion Share is an open-source utility that can be used to share files of any size over the Tor network securely and anonymously. Onion Share then generates a long random URL that can be used by the recipient to download the file over the Tor network using Tor browser.

=== AnonSurf ===
Anonsurf is a utility that makes the operating system communication go over Tor or other anonymizing networks. According to Parrot, AnonSurf secures your web browser and anonymizes your IP.

== See also ==
- BackBox
- BlackArch
- Devuan
- Kali Linux
- List of digital forensics tools
- Security-focused operating system
- Tails
- Whonix
- Internet privacy
- Signal
- Linux Kodachi
