= Cobalt Labs =

Penetration testing company

- Type: Private
- Industry: Penetration testing
- Founded: 2013
- Headquarters: San Francisco, United States
- Number of employees: 180 (2021)
- Website: www.cobalt.io

Cobalt Labs is an American cybersecurity startup that offers penetration testing services. It was founded in 2013 and is based in San Francisco. It delivers penetration tests, which are carried out by vetted and verified security researchers, through a marketplace.

As of 2021, the startup has raised $37 million in funding.

In 2024, TechRepublic considered Cobalt Labs among the 6 best penetration testing companies. It was listed in the Inc 5000 list from 2021 to 2024.

== History ==
Cobalt was launched as CrowdCurity in 2013. It was set up by four Danes, namely Jacob Hansen, Esben Friis-Jensen, Jakob Storm and Christian Hansen. Jacob Hansen ran the business as chief executive from the outset. Among the earliest customers were Wix.com, GoDaddy and Paysafe.

In August 2020, the company closed a $29 million Series B led by Highland Europe, whose partner Gajan Rajanathan took a seat on the board. The round lifted total investment in the company to $37 million.

Cobalt employed 105 people at the time and had turned cash-flow positive earlier that year, an unusual position for a company at that stage. Accounts of its scale differed slightly: TechCrunch put the customer base at 600, while Tech.eu reported more than 500 clients alongside roughly 300 testers working through the platform. Customers named at that point included GoDaddy, Vonage, Axel Springer and MuleSoft.

=== Changes in leadership ===
Chris Manton-Jones, previously a sales executive at LogMeIn, replaced Jacob Hansen as chief executive in April 2022; Hansen remained on the board. The company reported more than 1,000 customers at that point, among them HubSpot, Verifone and Snow Software, and had opened a British office from which Manton-Jones worked.

In 2024, former Cobalt board member Sonali Shah became CEO. Her appointment ended a 28-month tenure for Manton-Jones, during which revenue rose, the business became profitable and headcount stayed at roughly 450. The product range had meanwhile widened beyond penetration testing to cover dynamic application security testing, attack surface management, digital risk assessments and testing of artificial intelligence systems and large language models. Shah had spent two decades in security product roles at Invicti, Human, Veracode, Bitsight and Syniverse.

== Services ==
Rather than selling individual assessments, Cobalt asks customers to buy testing credits under a subscription, sized to how many applications they run and how often they want each one examined. Testing itself is carried out by freelancers the company has vetted and verified, and is coordinated through its own software instead of being delivered as a report at the end of an engagement.

== See also ==
- Bug bounty program
- List of security assessment tools
