= ShmooCon =

American hacker convention

ShmooCon was an American hacker convention organized by The Shmoo Group. There were typically 40 different talks and presentations on a variety of subjects related to computer security and cyberculture. Multiple events were held at the convention related to cryptography and computer security such as Shmooganography, Hack Fortress, a locksport village hosted by TOOOL DC, and Ghost in the Shellcode.

The first event was held in 2005, with its last year was in 2025.

== Venues, dates, and attendance ==
Each conference venue and date has been included for easy reference.

Conference Name	Venue	Duration	Year	Attendance
ShmooCon I	Marriott Wardman Park	February 4–6	2005	~400 attendees
ShmooCon II	Marriott Wardman Park	January 13–15	2006	~700 attendees
ShmooCon III	Marriott Wardman Park	March 23–25	2007	900+ attendees
ShmooCon IV	Marriott Wardman Park	February 15–17	2008	1200+ attendees
ShmooCon V	Marriott Wardman Park	February 6–8	2009	1600+ attendees
ShmooCon VI	Marriott Wardman Park	February 5–7	2010	~1600 attendees
ShmooCon VII	Washington Hilton	January 28–30	2011	1600+ attendees
ShmooCon VIII	Washington Hilton	January 27–29	2012	1800+ attendees
ShmooCon IX	Hyatt Regency	February 15–17	2013	1600+ attendees
ShmooCon X	Washington Hilton	January 17–19	2014	1900+ attendees
ShmooCon XI	Washington Hilton	January 16–18	2015	1900+ attendees
ShmooCon XII	Washington Hilton	January 19–21	2016	1500+ attendees
ShmooCon XIII	Washington Hilton	January 13–15	2017	~2200 attendees
ShmooCon XIV	Washington Hilton	January 19–21	2018	~2200 attendees
ShmooCon XV	Washington Hilton	January 18–20	2019	2091 out of 2179 attendees checked in
ShmooCon XVI	Washington Hilton	January 31–February 2	2020	2097 out of 2170 attendees checked in
—			2021	Con not held
ShmooCon XVII	Washington Hilton	March 24–26	2022	1676 out of 1995 attendees checked in
ShmooCon XVIII	Washington Hilton	January 20–22	2023	2020 checked-in attendees
ShmooCon XIX	Washington Hilton	January 12-14	2024	2024 out of 2171 attendees checked in
ShmooCon XX	Washington Hilton	January 10-12	2025	TBA

== Research presented at ShmooCon ==
ShmooCon seeks to select talks that are original research and have not been presented at other conventions.

== Charitable efforts ==
Every year ShmooCon supported multiple charities, such as the Electronic Frontier Foundation and Hackers for Charity, by sponsoring T-shirt sales. Attendees were provided the opportunity to donate a fixed amount of money for a charity in exchange for a T-shirt. ShmooCon also had a long-standing program, Shmooze-A-Student, where attendees could opt to cover an undergraduate college student's ticket fee and stipend when purchasing their own ticket.

Year	EFF	HFC	Other	Total
2008	$2,540	$1,660	$1,490 for One Laptop per Child	$5,690
2009	~$2,500	~$2,500	$3,290 for Covenant House from raffle	~$8,290
2010	$2,704	$3,324	$2,284 for American Red Cross	$8,312
2011	$5,010	$7,640		$12,650
2012	$6,215	$6,175		$12,390
2013	$7,165	$6,250		$13,415
2014	$5,600	$6,700		$12,300
2015	$8,050	$7,920		$15,970
2016	—	—	—	—
2017	$4,185	$4,010	$3,490 for Child's Play	$11,685
2018	$7,330	$6,715	$4,176 for The Planetary Society	$18,221
2019	>$5,866	>$5,314	>$5,110 for No Starch Press Foundation	>$16,290
2020	>$6,800	>$5,125	>$4,135 for No Starch Press Foundation	>$16,060
2022	$7,875	—	$9,950 for Capital Area Food Bank	$17,825
2023	$11,640	—	$9,495 for Broadway Cares	$21,135
2024	$8,385	—	$10,380 for Memorial Sloan Kettering Cancer Center	$18,765
