= Tiger team =

Team of specialists

A tiger team is a team of specialists assembled to work on a specific goal, or to solve a particular problem.

== Origin of the term ==
A 1964 paper entitled Program Management in Design and Development used the term tiger teams and defined it as "a team of undomesticated and uninhibited technical specialists, selected for their experience, energy, and imagination, and assigned to track down relentlessly every possible source of failure in a spacecraft subsystem or simulation". Walter C. Williams gave this definition in response to the question "How best can advancements in reliability/maintainability state-of-the-art be attained and used with compressed schedules?" Williams was an engineer at the Manned Spacecraft Center and part of the Edwards Air Force Base National Advisory Committee for Aeronautics.

The paper consists of anecdotes and answers to questions from a panel on improving issues in program management concerning testing and quality assurance in aerospace vehicle development and production. The panel consisted of Williams, Col. J. R. Dempsey of General Dynamics, Lt. Gen. W. A. Davis from the Ballistic Systems Division, Norton Air Force Base, A. S. Crossfield from North American Aviation.

== Examples ==
- A tiger team was crucial to the Apollo 13 crewed lunar mission in 1970. During the mission, part of the Apollo 13 Service Module malfunctioned and exploded. A team of specialists led by NASA Flight and Mission Operations Director Gene Kranz was formed to address the resulting problems and bring the astronauts back to Earth safely. Kranz and the members of his "White Team", later designated the "Tiger Team", received the Presidential Medal of Freedom for their efforts in the Apollo 13 mission.
- In security work, a tiger team is a group that tests an organization's ability to protect its assets by attempting to defeat its physical or information security. In this context, the tiger team is often a permanent team as security is typically an ongoing priority. For example, one implementation of an information security tiger team approach divides the team into two co-operating groups: one for vulnerability research, which finds and researches the technical aspects of a vulnerability, and one for vulnerability management, which manages communication and feedback between the team and the organization, as well as ensuring each discovered vulnerability is tracked throughout its life-cycle and ultimately resolved.
- An initiative involving tiger teams was implemented by the United States Department of Energy (DOE) under then-Secretary James D. Watkins. From 1989 through 1992 the DOE formed tiger teams to assess 35 DOE facilities for compliance with environment, safety, and health requirements. Beginning in October 1991 smaller tiger teams were formed to perform more detailed follow-up assessments to focus on the most pressing issues.
- The NASA Engineering and Safety Center (NESC) puts together "tiger teams" of engineers and scientists from multiple NASA centers to assist solving complex problems when requested by a project or program.
- In March 2025, National Security Advisor Mike Waltz mentioned the term in the leaked Signal chat regarding an anticipated strike against the Houthis.

== See also ==
- Penetration test
- Red team
