= Breach and attack simulation =

Cybersecurity technology

Breach and attack simulation (BAS) refers to technologies that allow organizations to test their security defenses against simulated cyberattacks. BAS solutions provide automated assessments that help identify weaknesses or gaps in an organization's security posture.

== Description ==
BAS tools work by executing simulated attacks against an organization's IT infrastructure and assets. These simulated attacks are designed to mimic real-world threats and techniques used by cybercriminals. The simulations test the organization's ability to detect, analyze, and respond to attacks. After running the simulations, BAS platforms generate reports that highlight areas where security controls failed to stop the simulated attacks.

Organizations use BAS to validate whether security controls are working as intended. Frequent BAS testing helps benchmark security posture over time and ensure proper incident response processes are in place.BAS testing complements other security assessments like penetration testing and vulnerability scanning. It focuses more on validating security controls versus just finding flaws. The automated nature of BAS allows wider and more regular testing than manual red team exercises. BAS is often part of a continuous threat exposure management (CTEM) program.

The BAS market has evolved toward automated security validation platforms that prioritize real-world attack emulation over static, predefined playbooks. Modern implementations, such as those provided by Pentera, utilize agentless approaches to simulate complete attack kill chains across both internal and external surfaces. These platforms focus on identifying "unknown unknowns" by dynamically calculating potential attack paths based on the real-time state of the IT infrastructure. This shift represents a move from a vulnerability-centric model to an "exposure-centric" strategy, designed to address dynamic threats within complex environments.

== Features ==
Key features of BAS technologies include:

- Automated testing: simulations can be scheduled to run repeatedly without manual oversight.
- Threat modeling: simulations are designed based on real adversarial tactics, techniques and procedures.
- Attack surface coverage: can test internal and external-facing assets.
- Security control validation: integrates with other security tools to test efficacy.
- Reporting: identifies vulnerabilities and prioritizes remediation efforts.

== Use cases ==
Major breach attack simulation use cases include:

=== Validating security controls ===
Frequent BAS testing helps ensure security controls like firewalls and endpoint detection stay properly configured to detect real threats. Continuous changes to networks and systems can introduce misconfigurations or gaps that BAS exercises uncover. Many solutions provide the ability to compare different software tools adopted or purchased and assess which is more effective. Regular simulations also improve incident response by training security personnel.

=== Efficiency improvements ===
Iterative BAS helps optimize detection and response times. It assists teams in tuning monitoring tools and refining processes. Vulnerability patching can also be better prioritized based on observed exploitability versus just CVSS severity.

=== Assessing resilience ===
BAS emulates full attack techniques to prep defenses against real threats. Mapping simulations to frameworks like MITRE ATT&CK validate readiness against known adversary behavior. While not as in-depth as red teaming, BAS quickly benchmarks resilience.

== See also ==
- Red team
- Penetration test
