= BlackArch =

Penetration testing distribution based on Arch Linux

BlackArch Linux

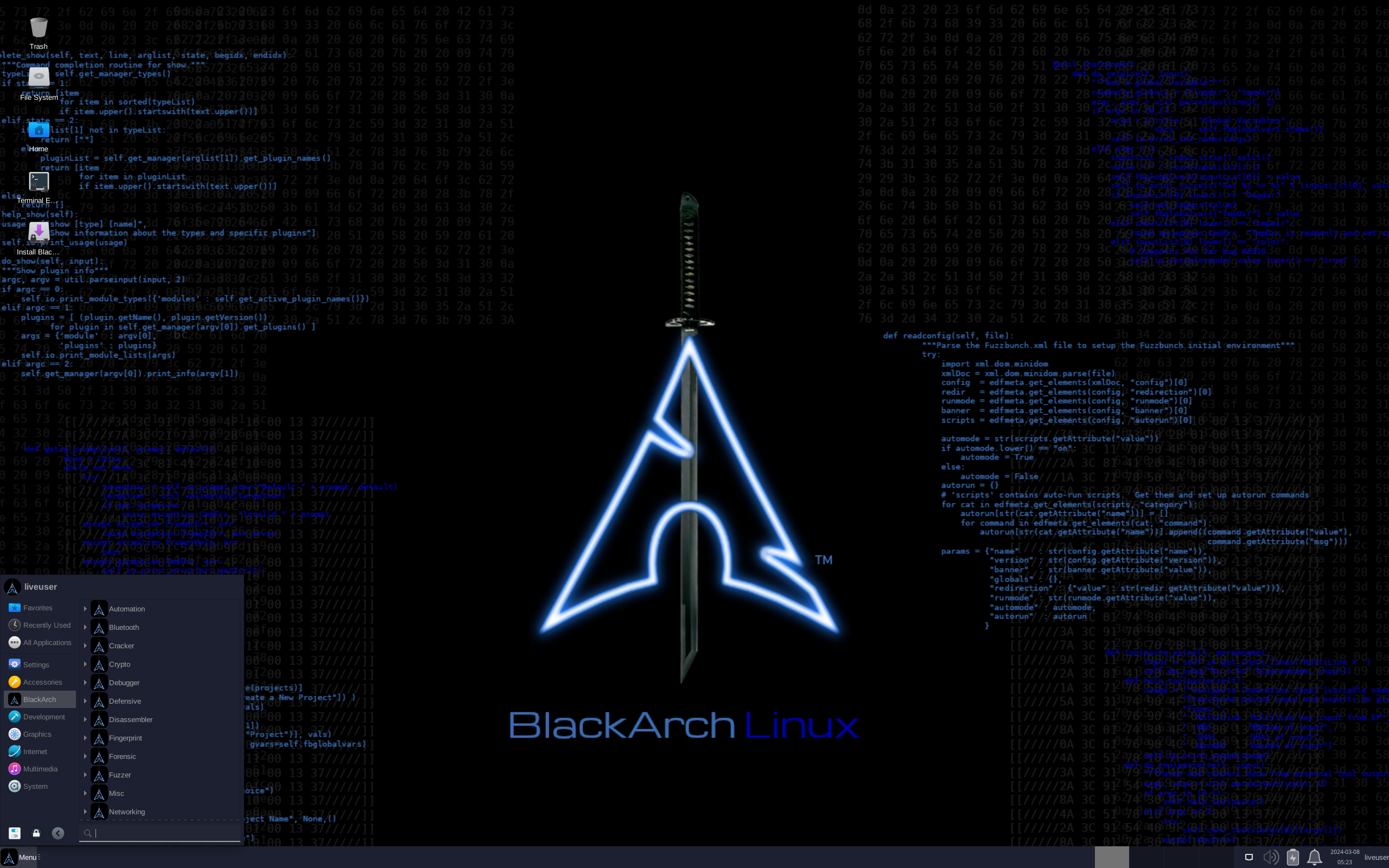
- Developer: Levon 'noptrix' Kayan (Lead Developer)
- OS family: Linux (Unix-like)
- Working state: Current
- Source model: Open-source
- Initial release: 16 August 2012; 14 years ago
- Latest release: 2023.01.05 / 3 years ago
- Repository: github.com/blackarch
- Marketing target: Penetration Testers and Security Researchers
- Update method: Rolling release
- Package manager: Pacman
- Supported platforms: x86-64, aarch64
- Kernel type: Monolithic (Linux kernel)
- Userland: GNU
- Default user interface: Fluxbox, AwesomeWM, i3wm, spectrwm, XFCE
- License: Various
- Official website: blackarch.org

BlackArch is a penetration testing distribution based on Arch Linux that provides a large number of security tools. It is an open-source distro created especially for penetration testers and security researchers. The repository contains more than 2800 tools that can be installed individually or in groups. BlackArch Linux is compatible with existing Arch Linux installations.

== Overview ==
BlackArch is similar in usage to both Parrot OS and Kali Linux when fully installed, with a major difference being BlackArch is based on Arch Linux instead of Debian.

BlackArch only provides the Xfce desktop environment in the "Slim ISO" but provides multiple preconfigured Window Managers in the "Full ISO".

Similar to Kali Linux and Parrot OS, BlackArch can be burned to an ISO image and run as a live system. BlackArch can also be installed as an unofficial user repository on any current Arch Linux installation.

== Packages ==
BlackArch currently contains 2866 packages and tools, along with their dependencies. BlackArch is developed by a small number of cyber security specialists and researchers that add the packages as well as dependencies needed to run these tools.

Tools categories within the BlackArch distribution (Counting date: 15 April 2024):

1. blackarch-anti-forensic: 2 tools
2. blackarch-automation: 109 tools
3. blackarch-automobile: 3 tools
4. blackarch-backdoor: 47 tools
5. blackarch-binary: 71 tools
6. blackarch-bluetooth: 25 tools
7. blackarch-code-audit: 34 tools
8. blackarch-cracker: 169 tools
9. blackarch-crypto: 81 tools
10. blackarch-database: 5 tools
11. blackarch-debugger: 15 tools
12. blackarch-decompiler: 17 tools
13. blackarch-defensive: 46 tools
14. blackarch-disassembler: 20 tools
15. blackarch-dos: 30 tools
16. blackarch-drone: 4 tools
17. blackarch-exploitation: 186 tools
18. blackarch-fingerprint: 30 tools
19. blackarch-firmware: 4 tools
20. blackarch-forensic: 129 tools
21. blackarch-fuzzer: 85 tools
22. blackarch-hardware: 6 tools
23. blackarch-honeypot: 16 tools
24. blackarch-ids: 1 tool
25. blackarch-keylogger: 3 tools
26. blackarch-malware: 34 tools
27. blackarch-misc: 144 tools
28. blackarch-mobile: 43 tools
29. blackarch-networking: 170 tools
30. blackarch-nfc: 1 tool
31. blackarch-packer: 2 tools
32. blackarch-proxy: 38 tools
33. blackarch-radio: 15 tools
34. blackarch-recon: 38 tools
35. blackarch-reversing: 42 tools
36. blackarch-scanner: 313 tools
37. blackarch-sniffer: 46 tools
38. blackarch-social: 59 tools
39. blackarch-spoof: 17 tools
40. blackarch-stego: 13 tools
41. blackarch-tunnel: 27 tools
42. blackarch-voip: 22 tools
43. blackarch-webapp: 310 tools
44. blackarch-windows: 134 tools
45. blackarch-wireless: 81 tools
46. Uncategorized tools: 3 tools; didier-stevens-suite, python-search-engine-parser, python-yara-rednaga
