= ITHC =

An ITHC, or IT Health Check, is an IT security assessment required, as part of an accreditation process, for many government computer systems in the UK.

An ITHC is generally performed by an external service provider, although NCSC personnel may perform ITHCs on especially sensitive systems. It can touch on both applications and infrastructure, and involves an element of penetration testing.

CHECK is a scheme for ITHC providers, run by NCSC.
