= Damn Vulnerable Linux =

Discontinued Linux distribution

- OS family: Linux (Unix-like)
- Working state: Discontinued
- Supported platforms: i486
- Kernel type: Monolithic kernel (Linux)

Damn Vulnerable Linux (DVL) is a discontinued SLAX-based Linux distribution geared towards computer security students. It functioned as a tool for observing and studying vulnerabilities in the Linux kernel and popular user space software. It is available as a live CD, and can be run through a virtual machine within the host operating system.

== History ==
DVL was created by Thorsten Schneider, the founder of the TeutoHack laboratory at Bielefeld University, to use as a training system for his university lectures.

== Design ==
DVL was a SLAX-based distribution, and used the Slackware .tgz package management system. It used outdated versions of various software, to deliberately make it the most vulnerable operating system ever.

DVL was distributed as a live CD, which allowed it to be booted directly from the distribution medium without installation on a PC or within a virtual machine.

== See also ==
- Damn Vulnerable Web Application
