= Scarab (comics) =

Scarab, in comics, may refer to:

- Scarab (Vertigo), a limited comic series
- Scarab (Nedor Comics), a Golden Age comic character
- Scarab (Awesome Comics), a member of the Re:Gex
- Scarab, a character in Kabuki
- Scarab, a Wildstorm character who fought Stormwatch: Team Achilles
- Scarlet Scarab, two Marvel Comics characters
- Silver Scarab, a character in DC Comics

== See also ==
- Scarab (disambiguation)
