= Kali Linux =

Debian-based Linux distribution for penetration testing

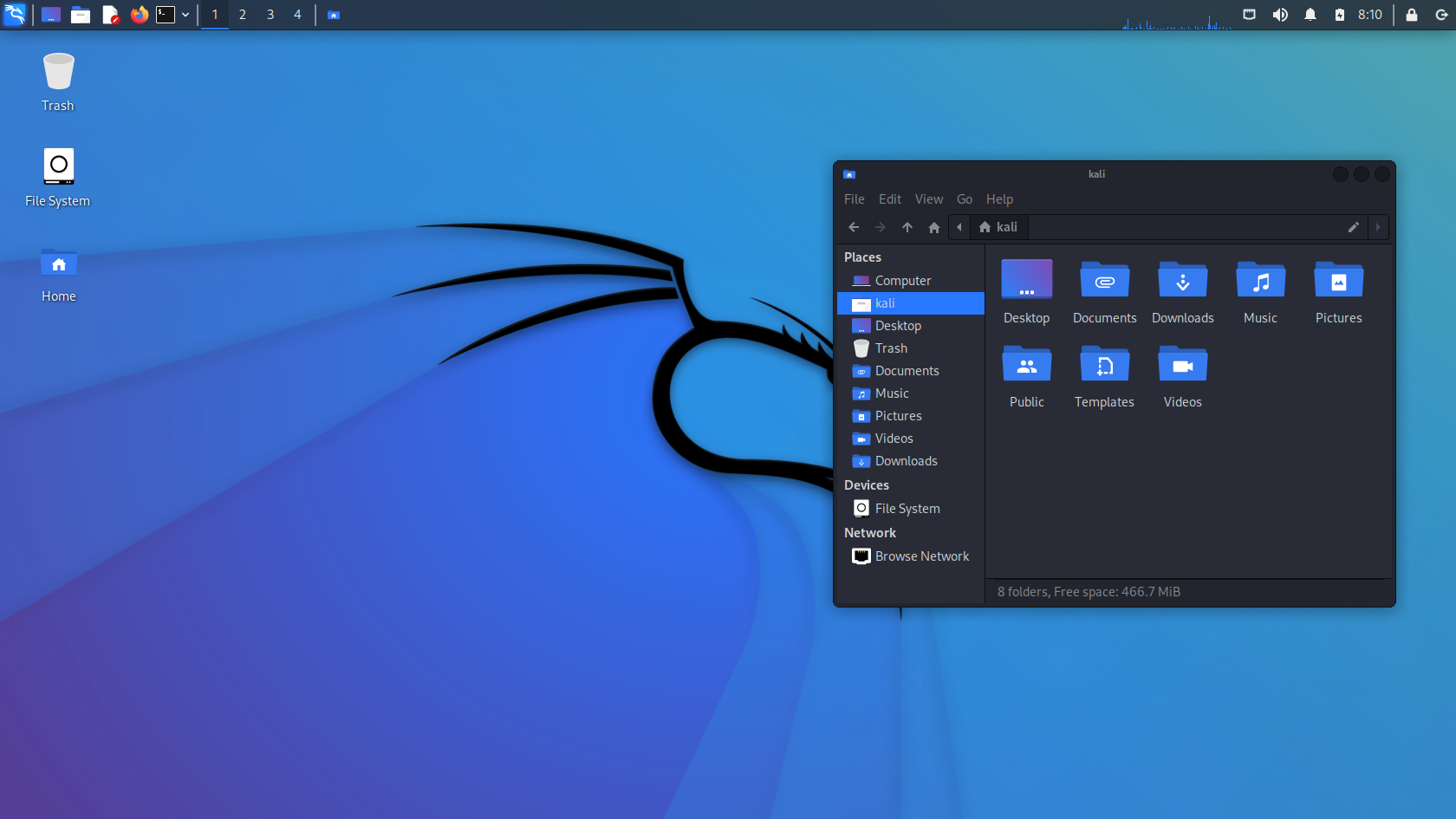
- Developer: Offensive Security
- OS family: Linux (Unix-like)
- Working state: Active
- Source model: Open-source
- Initial release: 13 March 2013 (13 years ago)
- Latest release: 2026.2 / 29 June 2026; 3 months ago
- Repository: pkg.kali.org
- Update method: Rolling release
- Package manager: APT (several front-ends available)
- Supported platforms: x86-64, armhf, aarch64 armhf, armhf, aarch64
- Kernel type: Monolithic (Linux)
- Default user interface: Xfce (others available)
- License: GNU General Public License v3.0
- Official website: www.kali.org

Kali Linux is a Linux distribution designed for digital forensics and penetration testing. It is maintained and funded by Offensive Security. The software is based on the testing branch of the Debian Linux Distribution: most packages Kali uses are imported from the Debian repositories. Kali Linux has gained popularity in the cybersecurity community due to its comprehensive set of tools designed for penetration testing, vulnerability analysis, and reverse engineering.

It was developed by Mati Aharoni and Devon Kearns of Offensive Security through the rewrite of BackTrack, their previous information security testing Linux distribution based on Knoppix.

Kali Linux was featured in multiple episodes of the TV series Mr. Robot.

== Version history ==
The first version, 1.0.0 "moto", was released in March 2013. The name is not a reference to the Hindu goddess, the Philippine martial art, or the word in Swahili but was chosen without a deeper meaning.

With version 2019.4 in November 2019, the default user interface was switched from GNOME to Xfce, with a GNOME version still available. However the preinstalled terminal emulator is QTerminal from the LXQt desktop environment, instead of xfce4-terminal.

With version 2020.3 in August 2020, the default shell was switched from Bash to ZSH, with Bash remaining as an option.

Since version 2023.1, the KDE Plasma version uses Wayland.

With version 2024.4 in December 2024, version 6.11 of the Linux kernel is introduced, official support for 32-bit images is dropped, and DSA keys are deprecated for OpenSSH.

With version 2025.1 in March 2025, Kali Linux introduced a 2025 annual theme refresh with updated boot menu, login screen, and desktop wallpapers. The release added KDE Plasma 6.2 and Xfce 4.20 desktop environments. Raspberry Pi support was enhanced with a new kernel based on version 6.6.74 and the same raspi-firmware package as Raspberry Pi OS, adding full support for the Raspberry Pi 5. The NetHunter app received a new CAN Arsenal tab for car hacking capabilities.

With version 2025.2 in June 2025, the Kali menu was reorganised to follow the MITRE ATT&CK framework structure, making tool navigation more intuitive for both red teams and blue teams. The release also included a major upgrade to BloodHound Community Edition with a full set of ingestors, GNOME 48 and KDE Plasma 6.3 updates, and 13 new tools. NetHunter gained Smartwatch Wi-Fi injection capabilities on the TicWatch Pro 3.

With version 2025.3 in September 2025, Kali Linux added Packer and Vagrant support for building and managing virtual machine environments, and native monitor mode and packet injection for the Raspberry Pi's built-in Wi-Fi using Nexmon. Ten new tools were added, including Caido (a web security auditing toolkit), Gemini CLI, and krbrelayx (a Kerberos relaying toolkit). Support for the ARMel (armel) architecture was also dropped in this release.

With version 2025.4 in December 2025, Kali Linux introduced three new tools (bpf-linker, evil-winrm-py, and hexstrike-ai), and major desktop environment updates. GNOME 49 was included, which drops X11 support and runs solely on Wayland. KDE Plasma was updated to version 6.5, and Xfce gained color theme support. Full VM guest utilities support for VirtualBox, VMware, and QEMU was added for Wayland. NetHunter received expanded device support, including Android 16 on the Samsung Galaxy S10, and a Wifipumpkin3 preview for rogue access point attacks.

With version 2026.1 in March 2026, Kali Linux launched a 2026 annual theme refresh covering the boot splash screen, bootloader theme, desktop wallpapers, and installer design. The release introduced a BackTrack Mode feature and added eight new tools including SSTImap, WPProbe, and XSStrike. A total of 25 new packages were included with 183 package updates.

With version 2026.2 in June 2026, desktop environments were updated to GNOME 50 and KDE Plasma 6.6. The release included helper scripts, APT format improvements, and VM boot tweaking utilities. Nine new tools were added along with NetHunter updates.

== Requirements ==
Kali Linux requires:

- A minimum of 20GB hard disk space for installation, depending on the version. Version 2020.2 requires at least 20GB.
- A minimum of 128 MB of RAM, 2 GB if opting to use the Xfce4 interface
- A CD-DVD drive, USB stick or other bootable media.

== Supported platforms ==
Kali Linux is currently distributed as a 64-bit images for use on hosts based on the x86-64 architecture and as an image for the ARM architecture for use on the BeagleBoard computer and Samsung's ARM Chromebook. With the release of 2024.4, 32-bit images based on the i386 architecture were officially dropped.

The developers of Kali Linux aim to make Kali Linux available for more ARM devices.

Kali Linux is already available for Asus Chromebook Flip C100P, BeagleBone Black, HP Chromebook, CubieBoard 2, CuBox, CuBox-i, Raspberry Pi, EfikaMX, Odroid U2, Odroid XU, Odroid XU3, Samsung Chromebook, Utilite Pro, Galaxy Note 10.1, and SS808.

With the arrival of Kali NetHunter, Kali Linux is also officially available on Android devices such as the Nexus 5, Nexus 6, Nexus 7, Nexus 9, Nexus 10, OnePlus One, and some Samsung Galaxy models. It has also been made available for more Android devices through unofficial community builds.

Kali Linux is available on Windows 10, on top of Windows Subsystem for Linux (WSL). The official Kali distribution for Windows can be downloaded from the Microsoft Store.

== Comparison with other Linux distributions ==
Kali Linux is developed with a focus towards cyber security experts, penetration testers, and white-hat hackers. There are a few other distributions dedicated to penetration testing, such as Parrot OS, BlackArch, and Wifislax. Kali Linux has stood out against these other distributions for cyber security and penetration testing, as well as having made distinct design decisions such as the default user being the superuser before its policy change in 2020.1 and later.

== Included software ==
Kali Linux includes a large range of security tools, organized into categories aligned with penetration testing workflows. These include tooling for information gathering, vulnerability analysis, web application testing, password attacks, wireless attacks, exploitation, sniffing and spoofing, post-exploitation, forensics, reporting, and social engineering.

Notable tools bundled with Kali Linux include Nmap for network discovery and port scanning, Metasploit for exploit development and delivery, Wireshark for network protocol analysis, Burp Suite for web application security testing, John the Ripper and Hashcat for password cracking, Aircrack-ng for wireless network auditing, and Nessus (trial version). Kali also includes sqlmap for automated SQL injection testing and OWASP ZAP for dynamic web application security scanning.

Kali Linux includes tooling for browser exploitation, reverse engineering, and general exploit development.

== Kali Purple ==
Kali Purple is a flavor of Kali introduced in 2023 specifically designed for defensive security. It features its own suite of tools sorted into categories that correspond to the NIST Cybersecurity Framework.

== Kali NetHunter ==
Kali NetHunter, an Android-based penetration testing platform, expands Kali’s capabilities, allowing penetration testing from Android devices, providing features like wireless frame injection and MITM attacks.

It was the first open source Android penetration testing platform for Nexus devices, created as a joint effort between the Kali community member "BinkyBear" and Offensive Security. It supports Wireless 802.11 frame injection, one-click MANA Evil Access Point setups, HID keyboard (Teensy like attacks), as well as Bad USB MITM attacks.

== See also ==
- Kali NetHunter
- List of digital forensic tools
- Offensive Security
- Offensive Security Certified Professional
- Security-focused operating system
