= Lorcon =

lorcon (acronym for Loss Of Radio CONnectivity) is an open source network tool. It is a library for injecting 802.11 (WLAN) frames, capable of injecting via multiple driver frameworks, without the need to change the application code. Lorcon is built by patching the third-party MadWifi-driver for cards based on the Qualcomm Atheros wireless chipset.

The project is maintained by Joshua Wright and Michael Kershaw ("dragorn").
