= Offensive Security Certified Professional =

Ethical hacking certification by Offensive Security

Offensive Security Certified Professional (OSCP, also known as OffSec Certified Professional) is an ethical hacking certification offered by Offensive Security (or OffSec) that teaches penetration testing methodologies and the use of the tools included with the Kali Linux distribution (successor of BackTrack). The OSCP is a hands-on penetration testing certification, requiring holders to successfully attack and penetrate various live machines in a safe lab environment. It is considered more technical than other ethical hacking certifications, and is one of the few certifications that requires evidence of practical penetration testing skills.

== OSCP+ ==
The Offensive Security Certified Professional Plus (OSCP+) is an extension of the OSCP certification introduced by Offensive Security on November 1, 2024. Unlike the lifetime OSCP certification, OSCP+ requires renewal every three years, reflecting industry demands for current cybersecurity expertise.

=== Certification requirements ===
To maintain the OSCP+ designation, certificate holders must complete one of three continuing education paths within the three-year validity period:

- Pass a recertification exam within 6 months of expiration
- Obtain another qualifying OffSec certification (such as OSEP, OSWA, OSED, or OSEE)
- Complete OffSec's Continuing Professional Education (CPE) program

=== Relationship to OSCP ===
The OSCP+ certification is awarded alongside the traditional OSCP when candidates pass the updated exam after November 1, 2024. Existing OSCP holders retain their lifetime certification regardless of whether they pursue the OSCP+ designation. The primary distinction lies in the validity period and recertification requirements, as the OSCP remains a lifetime certification while OSCP+ expires after three years without renewal.

== Recertification ==
The OSCP does not require recertification.

== Relations to other security trainings or exams ==
Successful completion of the OSCP exam qualifies the student for 40 (ISC)² CPE credits.

In 2015, the UK's predominant accreditation body for penetration testing, CREST, began recognising OSCP as equivalent to their intermediate level qualification CREST Registered Tester (CRT).

== Reception ==
In "Kali Linux: A toolbox for pentest," JM Porup called OSCP certification "coveted" because it required passing a difficult 24-hour exam demonstrating hacking. In a press release on a new chief operating officer for a security services company, the company's use of OSCP professionals was described as a strength. In "The Ultimate Guide To Getting Started With Cybersecurity" Vishal Chawla of Analytics India Mag recommended OSCP as one of two "well known" security certifications. In an interview of Offensive Security CEO Ning Wang, Adam Bannister of The Daily Swig discussed a "major update" to "Penetration Testing with Kali Linux (PWK)" training course, which leads to OSCP certification for students who pass the final exam. The training updates were discussed in detail in helpnet security.

In The Basics of Web Hacking: Tools and Techniques to Attack the Web, Josh Pauli called OSCP "highly respected." Cybersecurity Education for Awareness and Compliance gave a syllabus outline of the training course for OSCP. In Phishing Dark Waters: The Offensive and Defensive Sides of Malicious Emails, co-author Christopher Hadnagy listed OSCP as one of his qualifications. Certified Ethical Hacker (CEH) Foundation Guide listed OSCP as one of two certifications by Offensive Security for a "Security Testing Track." Sicherheit von Webanwendungen in der Praxis also included OSCP in a list of recommended certifications. Building a Pentesting Lab for Wireless Networks called Offensive Security training "practical and hands-on" and said they were "most recommended."

In "The Information Security Undergraduate Curriculum: Evolution of a Small Program" Lionel Mew of University of Richmond said 35% of Information security jobs require certifications, and described OSCP as a "popular certification." "Maintaining a Cybersecurity Curriculum: Professional Certifications as Valuable Guidance" called OSCP an "advanced certification" and one of "a select few" requiring hands-on penetration skills demonstrations.
