= Armitage (computing) =

Cyber attack management tool

- Original author: Raphael Mudge
- Stable release: 08.13.15 / August 13, 2015; 11 years ago
- Written in: Java
- Operating system: Cross-platform
- Available in: English
- Type: Computer security
- License: BSD 3-Clause License
- Website: http://www.fastandeasyhacking.com/

Armitage is a graphical cyber attack management tool for the Metasploit Project that visualizes targets and recommends exploits. It is a free and open source network security tool notable for its contributions to red team collaboration allowing for: shared sessions, data, and communication through a single Metasploit instance. Armitage is written and supported by Raphael Mudge.

== History ==
Armitage is a GUI front-end for the Metasploit Framework developed by Raphael Mudge with the goal of helping security professionals better understand hacking and to help them realize the power of Metasploit. It was originally made for Cyber Defense Exercises, but has since expanded its user base to other penetration testers.

== Features ==
Armitage is a scriptable red team collaboration tool built on top of the Metasploit Framework. Through Armitage, a user may launch scans and exploits, get exploit recommendations, and use the advanced features of the Metasploit Framework's meterpreter.
