= BackTrack =

Linux distribution

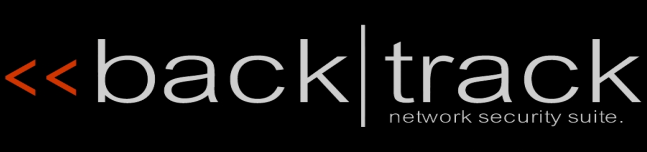
- Backtrack

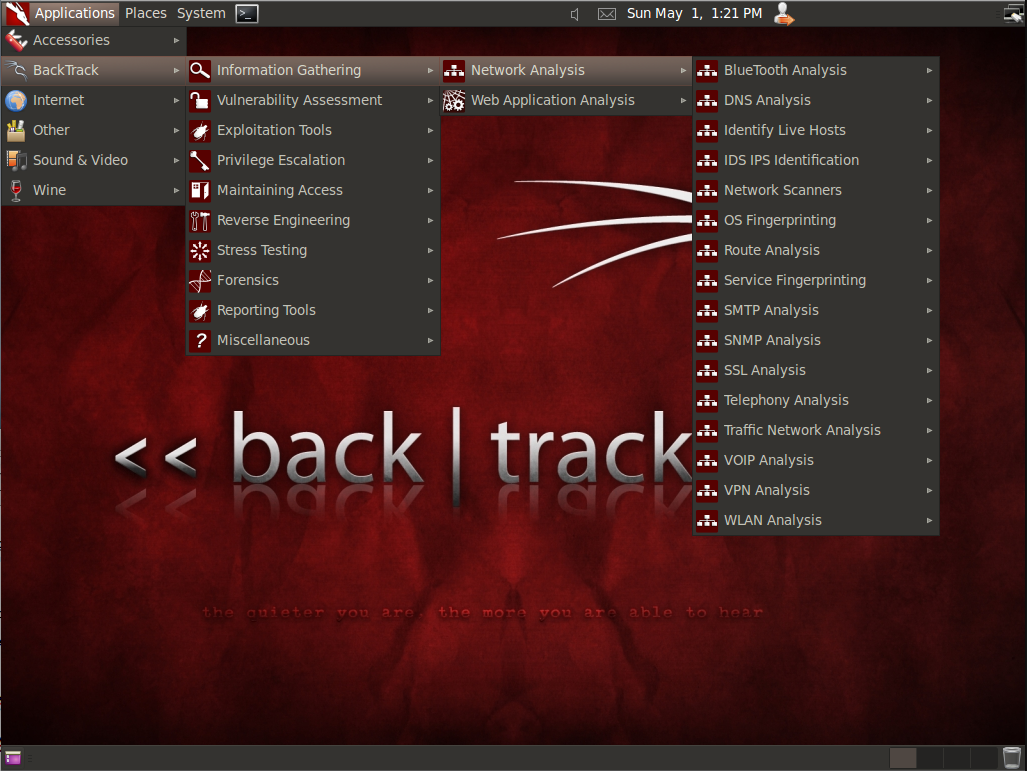
- BackTrack 5 R3
- Developer: Offensive Security: Mati Aharoni; Devon Kearns
- OS family: Linux (Unix-like)
- Working state: Discontinued
- Source model: Open source
- Initial release: May 26, 2006; 20 years ago
- Final release: 5 R3 / August 13, 2012; 14 years ago
- Supported platforms: i386 (x86), AMD64 (x86-64), ARM
- Kernel type: Monolithic
- Default user interface: Bash, KDE Plasma Desktop, Fluxbox, GNOME
- License: Various
- Preceded by: WHAX; Auditor Security Collection
- Succeeded by: Kali Linux
- Official website: www.backtrack-linux.org

BackTrack was a Linux distribution that focused on security, based on the Knoppix Linux distribution aimed at digital forensics and penetration test use. In March 2013, the Offensive Security team rebuilt BackTrack around the Debian distribution and released it under the name Kali Linux.

== History ==
The BackTrack distribution originated from the merger of two formerly competing distributions which focused on penetration testing:

- WHAX: a Slax-based Linux distribution developed by Mati Aharoni, a security consultant. Earlier versions of WHAX were called Whoppix and were based on Knoppix.
- Auditor Security Collection: a Live CD based on Knoppix developed by Max Moser which included over 300 tools organized in a user-friendly hierarchy.

On January 9, 2010, BackTrack 4 improved hardware support, and added official FluxBox support. The overlap with Auditor and WHAX in purpose and in collection of tools partly led to the merger. The overlap came about as Backtrack 5, released on May 10, 2011. This version also seen the base OS changed from Slackware to Ubuntu.

== Tools ==
BackTrack provided users with easy access to a comprehensive and large collection of security-related tools ranging from port scanners to Security Audit. Support for Live CD and Live USB functionality allowed users to boot BackTrack directly from portable media without requiring installation, though permanent installation to hard disk and network was also an option.

BackTrack included many well known security tools including:

- Metasploit for integration
- Wi-Fi drivers supporting monitor mode (rfmon mode) and packet injection
- Aircrack-ng
- Reaver, a tool used to exploit a vulnerability in WPS
- Gerix Wifi Cracker
- Kismet
- Nmap
- Ophcrack
- Ettercap
- Wireshark (formerly known as Ethereal)
- BeEF (Browser Exploitation Framework)
- Hydra
- OWASP Mantra Security Framework, a collection of hacking tools, add-ons and scripts based on Firefox
- Cisco OCS Mass Scanner, a very reliable and fast scanner for Cisco routers to test default telnet and enabling password.
- A large collection of exploits as well as more commonplace software such as browsers.
- Armitage - java-based front-end to Metasploit.

BackTrack arranged tools into 12 categories:

- Information gathering
- Vulnerability assessment
- Exploitation tools
- Privilege escalation
- Maintaining access
- Reverse engineering
- RFID tools
- Stress testing
- Forensics
- Reporting tools
- Services
- Miscellaneous

== Releases ==
Date	Release
May 26, 2006	First stable release of BackTrack based on Slackware
October 13, 2006	BackTrack 2 beta #1 released
November 19, 2006	BackTrack 2 beta #2 released
March 6, 2007	BackTrack 2 final released
December 14, 2007	BackTrack 3 beta released
June 19, 2008	BackTrack 3 final released (Linux kernel 2.6.21.5)
February 11, 2009	BackTrack 4 beta released
January 9, 2010	BackTrack 4 final release (Linux kernel 2.6.30.9 and base OS changed to Ubuntu)
May 8, 2010	BackTrack 4 R1 release
November 22, 2010	BackTrack 4 R2 release
May 10, 2011	BackTrack 5 release (Linux kernel 2.6.38)
August 18, 2011	BackTrack 5 R1 release (Linux kernel 2.6.39.5)
March 1, 2012	BackTrack 5 R2 release (Linux kernel 3.2.6)
August 13, 2012	BackTrack 5 R3 release

Whenever a new version of BackTrack was released, older versions would lose their support and service from the BackTrack development team. There are currently no supported versions of BackTrack.
