= Damn Vulnerable Web Application =

Educational software

The Damn Vulnerable Web Application is a software project that intentionally includes security vulnerabilities and is intended for educational purposes.

== Examples ==
- Cross site scripting
- SQL injection

== See also ==
- Damn Vulnerable Linux
