= Pentoo =

Gentoo based Linux distribution for penetration testing

Pentoo Linux
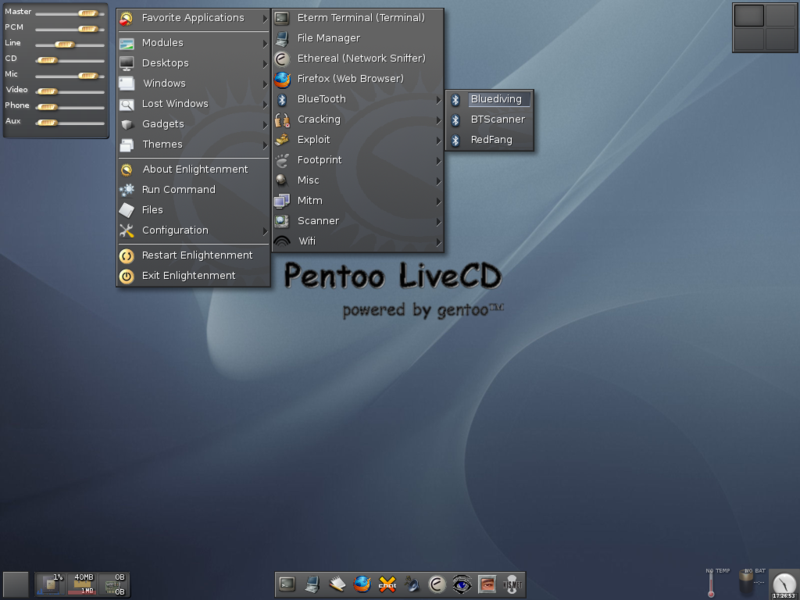
- Pentoo Linux 2010.0
- Developer: Grimmlin (Michael Zanetta - founder), Zero_Chaos (Rick Farina), blshkv (Anton Bolshakov), Wuodan (Stefan Kuhn), Jensp (Jens Pranaitis)
- OS family: Linux (Unix-like)
- Working state: Active
- Source model: Open source
- Initial release: June 22, 2005; 21 years ago
- Latest release: 2024.0 / January 11, 2024; 2 years ago
- Repository: github.com/pentoo/pentoo-overlay
- Update method: Emerge
- Package manager: Portage with Pentoo overlay
- Supported platforms: IA-32, x86-64
- Kernel type: Modular (Linux)
- Userland: GNU
- Default user interface: Xfce4 WM from LiveCD, various
- License: Free software licenses (mainly GPL)
- Official website: www.pentoo.ch

Pentoo is a Live CD and Live USB designed for penetration testing and security assessment. Based on Gentoo Linux, Pentoo is provided both as 32 and 64-bit installable live CD. Pentoo is also available as an overlay for an existing Gentoo installation. It features packet injection patched Wi-Fi drivers, GPGPU cracking software, and many tools for penetration testing and security assessment. The Pentoo kernel includes grsecurity and PaX hardening and extra patches - with binaries compiled from a hardened toolchain with the latest nightly versions of some tools available.

== Features ==
- Available in 32-bit and 64-bit versions, the latter having a significant speed increase from 32 bits
- Includes the required environment to crack passwords using GPGPU with OpenCL and CUDA configured 'out of the box'
- Built on hardened linux, including a hardened kernel and toolchain
- Hardened kernel with extra patches
- Uses a Pentoo overlay, which allows tools to be built on top of a standard Gentoo build
- Support for full disk encryption with LUKS if installed on HDD
- Automated installation

== Tools ==
Tools are installed with versioned ebuilds and open-ended ebuilds, making it possible to pull in the latest subversions and still have installs tracked by package management. The following tool categories are included:

- Analyzer
- Bluetooth
- Cracker
- Database
- Development
- Exploit
- Footprint
- Forensics
- Forging
- Fuzzers
- Misc
- MitM
- Pentoo
- Proxy
- RCE
- Scanner
- SIP-VOIP
- Wireless

== Releases ==
Pentoo uses rolling releases with periodic ISO snapshots of the latest committed updates.

Date	Release
2005/06/22	Pentoo 2005.1
2006/02/02	Pentoo 2006.0
2006/07/05	Pentoo 2006.1
2009/12/04	Pentoo 2009.0
2012/07/30	Pentoo 2012.0
2013/03/09	Pentoo 2013.0 RC1.1
2013/07/04	Pentoo 2013.0 RC1.8
2014/08/08	Pentoo 2013.0 RC1.9
2014/03/17	Pentoo 2014.0 RC2.1
2014/08/08	Pentoo 2014.0 RC3
2014/09/25	Pentoo 2014.0 RC3.5
2014/11/16	Pentoo 2014.0 RC3.6
2015/01/05	Pentoo 2015.0 RC3.7
2015/12/02	Pentoo 2015.0 RC4.6
2016/08/02	Pentoo 2015.0 RC5
2018/03/26	Pentoo 2018.0 RC6.3
2018/07/10	Pentoo 2018.0 RC7.1
2019/01/17	Pentoo 2019.0
...	...
2025/11/03	Pentoo 2025.0
