= W3af =

Open-source web application security scanner

w3af
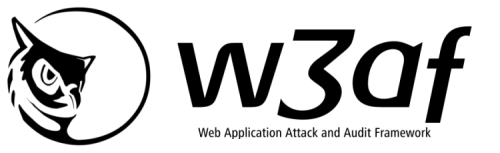

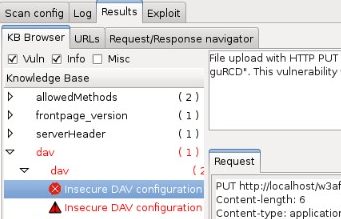
- "Web Application Attack and Audit Framework"
- Developer: Andres Riancho
- Stable release: 1.6.49 / 7 April 2015; 10 June 2015
- Repository: github.com/andresriancho/w3af
- Written in: Python
- Operating system: Windows, OS X, Linux, FreeBSD, OpenBSD
- Type: Computer security
- License: GPLv2
- Website: www.w3af.org

w3af (Web Application Attack and Audit Framework) is an open-source web application security scanner. The project provides a vulnerability scanner and exploitation tool for Web applications. It provides information about security vulnerabilities for use in penetration testing engagements. The scanner offers a graphical user interface and a command-line interface.

A fork has been made by the original authors under the name w4af, originally in an attempt to upgrade the code base to use Python 3 instead of Python 2.

== Architecture ==
w3af is divided into two main parts, the core and the plug-ins. The core coordinates the process and provides features that are consumed by the plug-ins, which find the vulnerabilities and exploit them. The plug-ins are connected and share information with each other using a knowledge base.

Plug-ins can be categorized as Discovery, Audit, Grep, Attack, Output, Mangle, Evasion or Bruteforce.

== History ==
w3af was started by Andres Riancho in March 2007, after many years of development by the community. In July 2010, w3af announced its sponsorship and partnership with Rapid7. With Rapid7's sponsorship the project will be able to increase its development speed and keep growing in terms of users and contributors.

== See also ==
- Metasploit Project
- Low Orbit Ion Cannon (LOIC)
- Web application security
- OWASP Open Web Application Security Project
