= Hackers for Charity =

Hackers for Charity is a non-profit organization started by Johnny Long dedicated to make skills-training available for people in Uganda. Hackers for Charity also help other nonprofits to better secure their system networks and computers.

== Background ==
Along with coordinating the donation of goods and supplies, Johnny Long lived in Uganda with his family for seven years, and helped set up computer networks and build village infrastructures. He also started a computer training center to provide free and low-cost technical training, a hackerspace, a restaurant, and a leather working program, all based in Jinja Uganda. Each of these projects are still running (as of May 2019). These projects were funded by donations from the hacker community through fundraising efforts at various conferences.

In 2010, in Dissecting the Hack: The F0rb1dd3n Network, an extensive interview of Johnny Long was published with Hackers for Charity discussed extensively.
