= Information technology security assessment =

Explicit study to locate security vulnerabilities

Information technology security assessment is a planned evaluation of security controls to determine whether they are implemented correctly, operating as intended, and where weaknesses exist.

== Lead ==
Information technology security assessment is a planned evaluation of security controls to determine whether they are implemented correctly, operating as intended, and where weaknesses exist.

Common practice organizes the work into three methods: examination of documents and configurations, interviews with personnel, and testing under defined conditions.

Assessment results support judgments about control effectiveness, validate and prioritize technical findings, and plan fixes with later verification or retest.

Security assessment is distinct from a risk assessment—which expresses risk in terms of likelihood and impact—and from an audit.

== Scope and terminology ==
Security assessment refers to a planned evaluation of security controls to check whether they are implemented correctly, operating as intended, and where weaknesses exist.

Common practice organizes assessment work into three methods: examination of documents and configurations, interviews with personnel, and testing under defined conditions.

A risk assessment is treated separately: risk is commonly expressed in terms of likelihood and impact, and the process identifies, estimates, and prioritizes risks for decisions .

An audit is also distinct: it is a systematic and independent evaluation of conformance in a management-system context; organizations may apply audits within an ISMS while using assessments to examine technical control effectiveness.

== Methodology ==
=== Planning ===
- Planning typically defines scope and objectives, sets rules of engagement, confirms legal and ethical constraints, and prepares accounts and environments.
- Good practice also records authorization, data-handling limits, and communications before testing begins.
- When software development is in scope, activities can align with secure development practices so findings map to the lifecycle.

=== Execution ===
- Execution combines examination, interviewing, and testing to gather evidence about control effectiveness.
- For web and application targets, typical coverage includes input validation, authentication and session management, and configuration.
- Public risk taxonomies such as the OWASP Top 10 provide a shared vocabulary for common weaknesses without naming vendors or tools.
- API-focused assessments often reference the API Security Top 10 to address issues specific to service interfaces.

=== Verification mindset ===
- Many teams verify implementations against requirement sets and assurance levels rather than following a tool-specific procedure.
- In regulated or contractual contexts, criteria may come from a control baseline or catalogue (for example, protecting controlled unclassified information).

=== Transition to reporting ===
- Assessment plans and evidence records support reproducibility by tracing each finding to the method used.
- Results normally include prioritized remediation and a plan for later verification or retest.

== Reporting ==
A typical assessment report states the scope and objectives, explains the methods used, and presents evidence-backed findings; where appropriate it also notes potential impact and likelihood, recommends fixes with priorities, and defines a plan for verification or retest.

To support reproducibility, assessment plans and evidence records allow reviewers to trace each finding to the technique and assessment objects that produced it.

Findings are often mapped to a recognized control catalogue or practice guide so owners know exactly what to change—for example, NIST SP 800-53 or ISO/IEC 27002.

== Risk and measurement ==
In practice, many organizations communicate results with qualitative or semi-quantitative scoring; this aligns with general risk-management guidance and information-security usage.

Quantitative analysis is also possible when a model and data are defined; Open FAIR is one widely cited approach for expressing frequency and loss.

ISO/IEC 27005 connects these ideas to information-security risk management and helps keep terminology consistent within an ISMS context.

== Tools (types rather than vendors) ==
Articles typically describe tool types—for example, vulnerability scanners, software-composition analysis, dynamic/interactive application testing, configuration checking, and evidence/issue tracking—rather than specific products.

Using a control/practice lens keeps the description neutral and durable because results can be mapped to established catalogues such as ISO/IEC 27002 and NIST SP 800-53.

== Relation to RMF / Continuous monitoring ==
Assessments sit within the NIST Risk Management Framework alongside control selection, implementation, authorization, and continuous monitoring; they are not a one-time event.

Continuous monitoring uses assessment activities and other data over time, feeding results back into risk and control decisions at the organization, mission, and system levels.

In many programs this work is coordinated through an ISMS, which provides requirements and governance for recurring assessments and audits.
