= Vulnerability assessment =

Process of identifying, quantifying, and prioritizing the vulnerabilities in a system

A vulnerability assessment is the process of identifying, quantifying, and prioritizing (or ranking) the vulnerabilities in a system. Examples of systems for which vulnerability assessments are performed include, but are not limited to, information technology systems, energy supply systems, water supply systems, transportation systems, and communication systems. Such assessments may be conducted on behalf of a range of different organizations, from small businesses up to large regional infrastructures. Vulnerability from the perspective of disaster management means assessing the threats from potential hazards to the population and to infrastructure. It may be conducted in the political, social, economic or environmental fields.

== Relationship with risk assessment ==
Vulnerability assessment has many things in common with risk assessment. Assessments are typically performed according to the following steps:

1. Cataloging assets and capabilities (resources) in a system.
2. Assigning quantifiable value (or at least rank order) and importance to those resources
3. Identifying the vulnerabilities or potential threats to each resource
4. Mitigating or eliminating the most serious vulnerabilities for the most valuable resources

"Classical risk analysis is principally concerned with investigating the risks surrounding a plant (or some other object), its design and operations. Such analysis tends to focus on causes and the direct consequences for the studied object. Vulnerability analysis, on the other hand, focuses both on consequences for the object itself and on primary and secondary consequences for the surrounding environment. It also concerns itself with the possibilities of reducing such consequences and of improving the capacity to manage future incidents." (Lövkvist-Andersen, et al., 2004) In general, a vulnerability analysis serves to "categorize key assets and drive the risk management process." (United States Department of Energy, 2002).

== Frameworks ==
In the United States, guides providing valuable considerations and templates for completing a vulnerability assessment are available from numerous agencies including the Department of Energy, the Environmental Protection Agency, and the United States Department of Transportation.

Several academic research papers including Turner et al. (2003), Ford and Smith (2004), Adger (2006), Fraser (2007) and Patt et al. (2010) amongst others, have provided a detail review of the diverse epistemologies and methodologies in vulnerability research. Turner et al. (2003) for example proposed a framework that illustrates the complexity and interactions involved in vulnerability analysis, draws attention to the array of factors and linkages that potentially affects the vulnerability of a couple of human–environment systems. The framework makes use of nested flowcharts to show how social and environmental forces interact to create situations vulnerable to sudden changes. Ford and Smith (2004), propose an analytical framework, based on research with Canadian arctic communities. They suggest that, the first stage is to assess current vulnerability by documenting exposures and current adaptive strategies. This should be followed by a second stage that estimates directional changes in those current risk factors and characterizes the community's future adaptive capacity. Ford and Smith's (2004) framework utilizes historic information including how communities have experienced and addressed climatic hazards, with information on what conditions are likely to change, and what constraints and opportunities there are for future adaptation.

== Vulnerability to climate change ==
Vulnerability assessment is important because it provides information that can be used to develop management actions in response to climate change. Climate change vulnerability assessments and tools are available at all scales. Macro-scale vulnerability assessment often uses indices. Modelling and participatory approaches are also in use. Global vulnerability assessments are based on spatial mapping using aggregated data for the regional or national level.

== Automation vs Manual ==
While automated vulnerability assessment tools provide baseline visibility into system misconfigurations, they struggle to evaluate complex application logic. According to testing frameworks established by organizations such as OWASP, automated scanners frequently generate false positives and miss complex edge cases. Organizations must pair automated scanning with targeted manual verification to evaluate real-world exploitability and business logic flaws.

== See also ==
- Vulnerability
- Vulnerability index
- Vulnerability scanner
- Vulnerability assessment (computing)
