= Sqlmap =

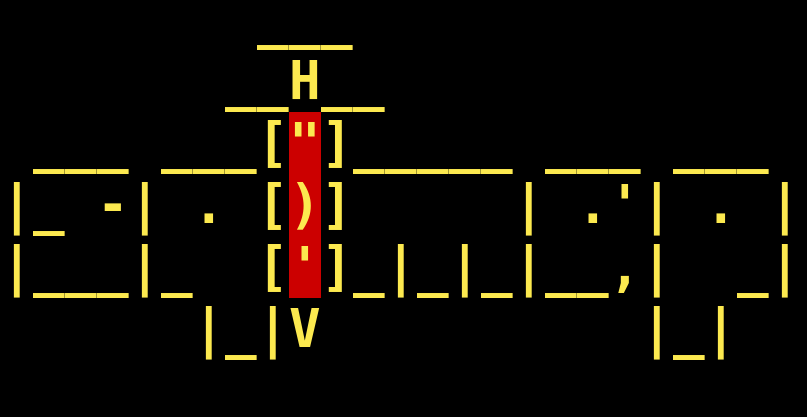
- Original author: Daniele Bellucci
- License: GNU General Public License, version 2
- Website: sqlmap.org
- Repository: github.com/sqlmapproject/sqlmap

sqlmap is a software utility for automated discovering of SQL injection vulnerabilities in web applications.

== Usage ==
The tool was used in the 2015 data breach of TalkTalk. In 2016, the Illinois Board of Election was breached using the tool, combined with Acunetix and DirBuster.
