= List of data-erasing software =

This is a list of utilities for performing data erasure.

Name	Developer	Licensing	Operating system required to run	Maintained?	Supported wipe methods	Reports
BleachBit	Andrew Ziem and contributors	GNU General Public License	Windows, Linux	Yes	external	on screen, Copy and Paste-able
CCleaner	Piriform	Trialware	Windows, OS X	Yes	external	?
Darik's Boot and Nuke (DBAN)	Darik Horn	GNU General Public License	OS independent, based on Linux	No	external	?
dd		Same as host OS	Unix	Yes	external	not directly supported without scripting
Disk Utility	Apple	Commercial proprietary software	OS X	Yes	external	?
Eraser	Heidi Computers Limited	GNU GPL v3	Windows	Yes	external	?
HDDerase	University of California, San Diego	Freeware	OS independent, based on DOS	No	internal	?
hdparm	Mark Lord	BSD license	Linux	Yes	internal	not directly supported without scripting
nwipe	Martijn van Brummelen	GNU GPL v2	Linux	Yes	external	Yes
Parted_Magic	Patrick Verner, Parted Magic LLC	uses mostly GPL components with published source, a few proprietary components, and fee for media/download	OS independent, based on Slackware Linux	Yes	internal, external	CSV, TXT, and extended TXT
shred	GNU Project	GNU GPL v3	Unix	Yes	external	not directly supported without scripting
ShredIt	Mireth Technology, Burningthumb Software	Trialware	Windows, OS X	Yes	?	?
srm	Dirk Jagdmann	MIT License	Unix	Yes	external	not directly supported without scripting

== See also ==
- List of data recovery software
