= ShredIt =

File eraser

- Original author(s): Mireth Technology
- Developer(s): Mireth Technology
- Initial release: 1998
- Stable release: Shredit 6.0.3 / July 20, 2012; 12 years ago
- Written in: Objective-C, C
- Operating system: Mac OS 7, Mac OS 8, Mac OS 9, Mac OS X, Windows, iOS
- Platform: Intel, PowerPC, Apple A4 Apple A5(ARM)
- Size: 3.5 MB
- Type: Data erasure
- License: Proprietary
- Website: Shredit Product Page

ShredIt is designed to securely erase files in a variety of ways, using various overwriting patterns. Originally released in 1998, Shredit is capable of erasing files on Mac OS 7 through Mac OS 10.8 and later, as well as Microsoft Windows 95 through Windows 7 and later and iOS (sublicensed by Burningthumb Software). Versions of ShredIt are available for 10.6 and later through the macOS App Store; earlier and alternate versions are available through the Mireth website.

== Features ==
- Safeplace
- Shredding by file, by folder or optical media

=== Overwriting Standards ===
- DoD 5220 Clear & DoD 5220 Sanitize
- DoE Secure Deletion
- Gutmann 35 Way Overwrite
- CD-RW Erasure
