= HDDerase =

Data erasure software

HDDerase is a freeware utility that securely erases data on hard drives using the Secure Erase unit command built into the firmware of Parallel ATA and Serial ATA drives manufactured after 2001. HDDerase was developed by the Center for Magnetic Recording Research at the University of California, San Diego. HDDerase is designed for command-line use only.

It differs from other file deletion programs such as Darik's Boot and Nuke which attempt to erase data using block writes which cannot access certain portions of the hard drive. The internal firmware Secure Erase command can access data that is no longer accessible through software, such as bad blocks.

== See also ==
- Data erasure
- Data remanence
- Undeletion
