= Anti–computer forensics =

Techniques used to obstruct forensic analysis

Anti–computer forensics or counter-forensics are techniques used to obstruct forensic analysis.

== Definition ==
Anti-forensics has only recently been recognized as a legitimate field of study.

One of the more widely known and accepted definitions comes from Marc Rogers. One of the earliest detailed presentations of anti-forensics, in Phrack Magazine in 2002, defines anti-forensics as "the removal, or hiding, of evidence in an attempt to mitigate the effectiveness of a forensics investigation".

A more abbreviated definition is given by Scott Berinato in his article entitled, The Rise of Anti-Forensics. "Anti-forensics is more than technology. It is an approach to criminal hacking that can be summed up like this: Make it hard for them to find you and impossible for them to prove they found you." Neither author takes into account using anti-forensics methods to ensure the privacy of one's personal data.

=== Sub-categories ===
Anti-forensics methods are often broken down into several sub-categories to make classification of the various tools and techniques simpler. One of the more widely accepted subcategory breakdowns was developed by Dr. Marcus Rogers. He has proposed the following sub-categories: data hiding, artifact wiping, trail obfuscation and attacks against the CF (computer forensics) processes and tools. Attacks against forensics tools directly has also been called counter-forensics.

=== Purpose and goals ===
Within the field of digital forensics, there is much debate over the purpose and goals of anti-forensic methods. The conventional wisdom is that anti-forensic tools are purely malicious in intent and design. Others believe that these tools should be used to illustrate deficiencies in digital forensic procedures, digital forensic tools, and forensic examiner education. This sentiment was echoed at the 2005 Blackhat Conference by anti-forensic tool authors, James Foster and Vinnie Liu. They stated that by exposing these issues, forensic investigators will have to work harder to prove that collected evidence is both accurate and dependable. They believe that this will result in better tools and education for the forensic examiner. Also, counter-forensics has significance for defence against espionage, as recovering information by forensic tools serves the goals of spies equally as well as investigators.

== Data hiding ==
Data hiding is the process of making data difficult to find while also keeping it accessible for future use. "Obfuscation and encryption of data give an adversary the ability to limit identification and collection of evidence by investigators while allowing access and use to themselves."

Some of the more common forms of data hiding include encryption, steganography and other various forms of hardware/software based data concealment. Each of the different data hiding methods makes digital forensic examinations difficult. When the different data hiding methods are combined, they can make a successful forensic investigation nearly impossible.

=== Encryption ===
One of the more commonly used techniques to defeat computer forensics is data encryption. In a presentation given on encryption and anti-forensic methodologies, the Vice President of Secure Computing, Paul Henry, referred to encryption as a "forensic expert's nightmare".

The majority of publicly available encryption programs allow the user to create virtual encrypted disks which can only be opened with a designated key. Through the use of modern encryption algorithms and various encryption techniques these programs make the data virtually impossible to read without the designated key.

File level encryption encrypts only the file contents. This leaves important information such as file name, size and timestamps unencrypted. Parts of the content of the file can be reconstructed from other locations, such as temporary files, swap file and deleted, unencrypted copies.

Most encryption programs have the ability to perform a number of additional functions that make digital forensic efforts increasingly difficult. Some of these functions include the use of a keyfile, full-volume encryption, and plausible deniability. The widespread availability of software containing these functions has put the field of digital forensics at a great disadvantage.

=== Steganography ===
Steganography is a technique where information or files are hidden within another file in an attempt to hide data by leaving it in plain sight. "Steganography produces dark data that is typically buried within light data (e.g., a non-perceptible digital watermark buried within a digital photograph)." While some experts have argued that the use of steganography techniques is not very widespread and therefore the subject shouldn't be given a lot of thought, most experts agree that steganography has the capability of disrupting the forensic process when used correctly.

According to Jeffrey Carr, a 2007 edition of Technical Mujahid (a jihadist online security publication) outlined the importance of using a steganography program called Secrets of the Mujahideen. According to Carr, the program was touted as giving the user the capability to avoid detection by current steganalysis programs. It did this through the use of steganography in conjunction with file compression.

=== Other forms of data hiding ===
Other forms of data hiding involve the use of tools and techniques to hide data throughout various locations in a computer system. Some of these places can include "memory, slack space, hidden directories, bad blocks, alternate data streams, (and) hidden partitions."

One of the more well known tools that is often used for data hiding is called Slacker (part of the Metasploit framework). Slacker breaks up a file and places each piece of that file into the slack space of other files, thereby hiding it from the forensic examination software. Another data hiding technique involves the use of bad sectors. To perform this technique, the user changes a particular sector from good to bad and then data is placed onto that particular cluster. The belief is that forensic examination tools will see these clusters as bad and continue on without any examination of their contents.

== Artifact wiping ==
The methods used in artifact wiping are tasked with permanently eliminating particular files or entire file systems. This can be accomplished through the use of a variety of methods that include disk cleaning utilities, file wiping utilities and disk degaussing/destruction techniques.

=== Disk cleaning utilities ===
Disk cleaning utilities use a variety of methods to overwrite the existing data on disks (see data remanence). The effectiveness of disk cleaning utilities as anti-forensic tools is often challenged as some believe they are not completely effective. Experts who don't believe that disk cleaning utilities are acceptable for disk sanitization base their opinions of current DOD policy, which states that the only acceptable form of sanitization is degaussing. (See National Industrial Security Program.) Disk cleaning utilities are also criticized because they leave signatures that the file system was wiped, which in some cases is unacceptable. Some of the widely used disk cleaning utilities include DBAN, srm, BCWipe Total WipeOut, KillDisk, PC Inspector and CyberScrubs cyberCide. Another option which is approved by the NIST and the NSA is CMRR Secure Erase, which uses the Secure Erase command built into the ATA specification.

=== File wiping utilities ===
File wiping utilities are used to delete individual files from an operating system. The advantage of file wiping utilities is that they can accomplish their task in a relatively short amount of time as opposed to disk cleaning utilities which take much longer. Another advantage of file wiping utilities is that they generally leave a much smaller signature than disk cleaning utilities. There are two primary disadvantages of file wiping utilities, first they require user involvement in the process and second some experts believe that file wiping programs don't always correctly and completely wipe file information. Some of the widely used file wiping utilities include BCWipe, R-Wipe & Clean, Eraser, Aevita Wipe & Delete and CyberScrubs PrivacySuite. On Linux tools like shred and srm can be also used to wipe single files. SSDs are by design more difficult to wipe, since the firmware can write to other cells therefore allowing data recovery. In these instances ATA Secure Erase should be used on the whole drive, with tools like hdparm that support it.

=== Disk degaussing / destruction techniques ===
Disk degaussing is a process by which a magnetic field is applied to a digital media device. The result is a device that is entirely clean of any previously stored data. Degaussing is rarely used as an anti-forensic method despite the fact that it is an effective means to ensure data has been wiped. This is attributed to the high cost of degaussing machines, which are difficult for the average consumer to afford.

A more commonly used technique to ensure data wiping is the physical destruction of the device. The NIST recommends that "physical destruction can be accomplished using a variety of methods, including disintegration, incineration, pulverizing, shredding and melting."

== Trail obfuscation ==
The purpose of trail obfuscation is to confuse, disorient, and divert the forensic examination process. Trail obfuscation covers a variety of techniques and tools that include "log cleaners, spoofing, misinformation, backbone hopping, zombied accounts, trojan commands."

One of the more widely known trail obfuscation tools is Timestomp (part of the Metasploit Framework). Timestomp gives the user the ability to modify file metadata pertaining to access, creation and modification times/dates. By using programs such as Timestomp, a user can render any number of files useless in a legal setting by directly calling into question the files' credibility.

Another well known trail-obfuscation program is Transmogrify (also part of the Metasploit Framework). In most file types the header of the file contains identifying information. A (.jpg) would have header information that identifies it as a (.jpg), a (.doc) would have information that identifies it as (.doc) and so on. Transmogrify allows the user to change the header information of a file, so a (.jpg) header could be changed to a (.doc) header. If a forensic examination program or operating system were to conduct a search for images on a machine, it would simply see a (.doc) file and skip over it.

== Attacks against computer forensics ==
In the past anti-forensic tools have focused on attacking the forensic process by destroying data, hiding data, or altering data usage information. Anti-forensics has recently moved into a new realm where tools and techniques are focused on attacking forensic tools that perform the examinations. These new anti-forensic methods have benefited from a number of factors to include well documented forensic examination procedures, widely known forensic tool vulnerabilities, and digital forensic examiners' heavy reliance on their tools.

During a typical forensic examination, the examiner would create an image of the computer's disks. This keeps the original computer (evidence) from being tainted by forensic tools. Hashes are created by the forensic examination software to verify the integrity of the image. One of the recent anti-tool techniques targets the integrity of the hash that is created to verify the image. By affecting the integrity of the hash, any evidence that is collected during the subsequent investigation can be challenged.

== Physical ==
To prevent physical access to data while the computer is powered on (from a grab-and-go theft for instance, as well as seizure from Law Enforcement), there are different solutions that could be implemented:

- Software frameworks like USBGuard or USBKill implement USB authorization policies and method of use policies. If the software is triggered, by insertion or removal of USB devices, a specific action can be performed. After the arrest of Silk Road's administrator Ross Ulbricht, a number of proof of concept anti-forensic tools have been created to detect seizing of the computer from the owner to shut it down, therefore making the data inaccessible if full disk encryption is used.
- Hardware cable anchors using the Kensington Security Slot to prevent stealing by opportunistic thieves.
- Hardware kill cables like BusKill that lock, shutdown, or wipe data when ejected
- Use of chassis intrusion detection feature in computer case or a sensor (such as a photodetector) rigged with explosives for self-destruction. In some jurisdictions this method could be illegal since it could seriously maim or kill an unauthorized user and could consist in destruction of evidence.
- Battery could be removed from a laptop to make it work only while attached to the power supply unit. If the cable is removed, shutdown of the computer will occur immediately causing data loss. In the event of a power surge the same will occur though.

Some of these methods rely on shutting the computer down, while the data might be retained in the RAM from a couple of seconds up to a couple minutes, theoretically allowing for a cold boot attack. Cryogenically freezing the RAM might extend this time even further and some attacks on the wild have been spotted. Methods to counteract this attack exist and can overwrite the memory before shutting down. Some anti-forensic tools even detect the temperature of the RAM to perform a shutdown when below a certain threshold.

Attempts to create a tamper-resistant desktop computer has been made (as of 2020, the ORWL model is one of the best examples). However, security of this particular model is debated by security researcher and Qubes OS founder Joanna Rutkowska.

== Use by criminals ==
While the study and applications of anti-forensics are generally available to protect users from forensic attacks of their confidential data by their adversaries (eg investigative journalists, human rights defenders, activists, corporate or government espionage), Mac Rogers of Purdue University notes that anti-forensics tools can also be used by criminals.

Rogers uses a more traditional "crime scene" approach when defining anti-forensics. "Attempts to negatively affect the existence, amount and/or quality of evidence from a crime scene, or make the analysis and examination of evidence difficult or impossible to conduct."

== Effectiveness of anti-forensics ==
Anti-forensic methods rely on several weaknesses in the forensic process including: the human element, dependency on tools, and the physical/logical limitations of computers. By reducing the forensic process's susceptibility to these weaknesses, an examiner can reduce the likelihood of anti-forensic methods successfully impacting an investigation. This may be accomplished by providing increased training for investigators, and corroborating results using multiple tools.

== See also ==
- Cryptographic hash function
- Data remanence
- DECAF
- Degauss
- Encryption
- Forensic disk controller
- Information privacy
- Keyfile
- Metadata removal tool
- Plausible deniability
- Tails (operating system)
