= Microsoft PC Manager =

System optimization software

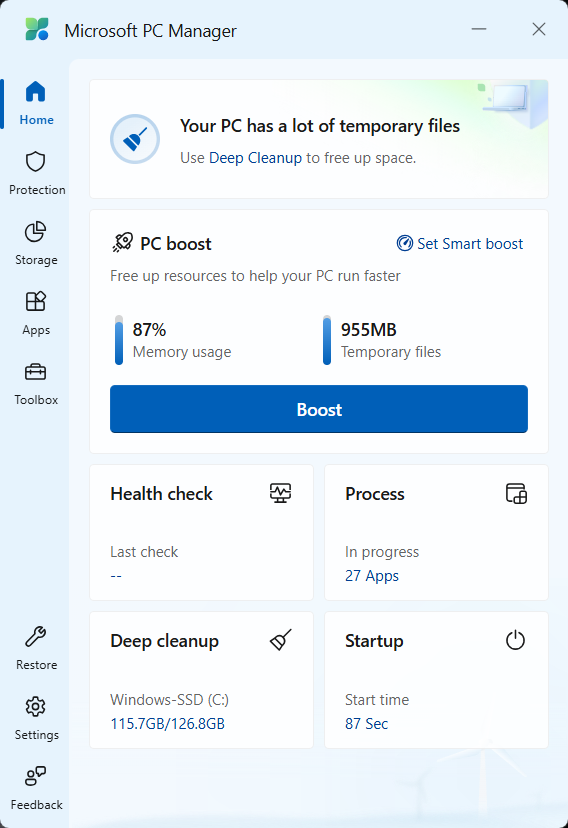
- Developer: Microsoft China
- Release: February 7, 2024; 2 years ago
- Stable release: 3.23.3 / November 12, 2026; 1 day ago
- Operating system: Windows 10, 11
- Available in: English (United States); Spanish (Mexico); Hindi; Indonesian; Japanese; Korean; Portuguese (Brazil); Russian; Turkish; Chinese (Simplified); Chinese (Traditional).
- Website: pcmanager.microsoft.com

Microsoft PC Manager is a free utility developed by Microsoft to help keep a Windows PC running smoothly by providing system optimization and performance management tools. It is designed to help users maintain the efficiency and performance of their PCs by offering various features that clean up unnecessary files, optimize system settings, and improve security. Microsoft PC Manager is available for Windows 10 and Windows 11. The app has tools to run process management, conduct repairs, perform cleanup, and make changes to settings, including, controversially, assisting users in switching to Bing, Edge and other Microsoft applications under the guise of "Restore default apps."

== See also ==
- CCleaner
