= Darik's Boot and Nuke =

Data erasure software

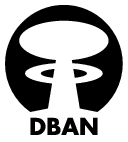

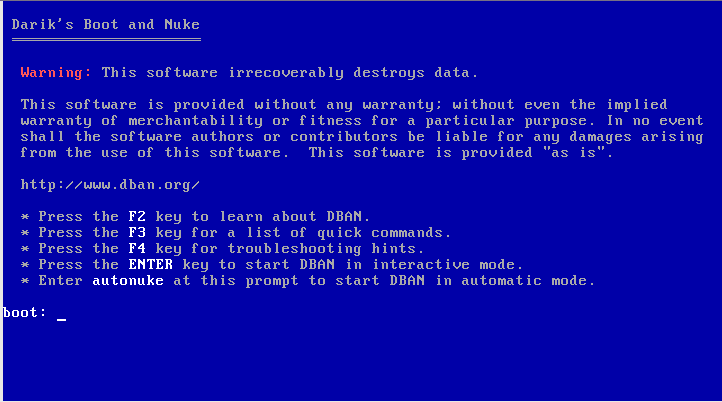
- Developer: Darik Horn
- Stable release: 2.3.0 / June 4, 2015
- Operating system: Linux
- Platform: x86
- Available in: English
- Type: Secure erase
- License: GPLv2
- Website: sourceforge.net/projects/dban/

Darik's Boot and Nuke, also known as DBAN /ˈdiːbæn/, is a freemium software hosted on SourceForge. The program is designed to securely erase a hard disk until its data is permanently removed and no longer recoverable, which is achieved by overwriting the data with pseudorandom numbers generated by Mersenne Twister or ISAAC. The Gutmann method, Quick Erase, DoD Short (3 passes), and DOD 5220.22-M (7 passes) are also included as options to handle data remanence. DBAN can be booted from a CD, DVD, USB flash drive or diskless using a Preboot Execution Environment. It is based on Linux and supports PATA (IDE), SCSI and SATA hard drives. DBAN can be configured to automatically wipe every hard disk that it sees on a system or entire network of systems, making it very useful for unattended data destruction scenarios. DBAN exists for x86 systems.

DBAN, like other methods of data erasure, is suitable for use prior to computer recycling for personal or commercial situations, such as donating or selling a computer, as well as disposing of hard drives.

== Current status ==
In September 2012, Blancco of Finland announced its acquisition of DBAN.

The most recent version of DBAN, 2.3.0, was released on 4 June 2015. Since that time, DBAN development has ended and the DBAN official website is now used by Blancco to market their Blancco Drive Eraser instead.

== nwipe ==
The dwipe program that DBAN uses has been forked and is available as a standalone command line program called nwipe, which is maintained by Martijn van Brummelen and released under the GNU General Public License 2.0 license.
