= BleachBit =

Free disk space cleaner, privacy manager, and computer system optimizer

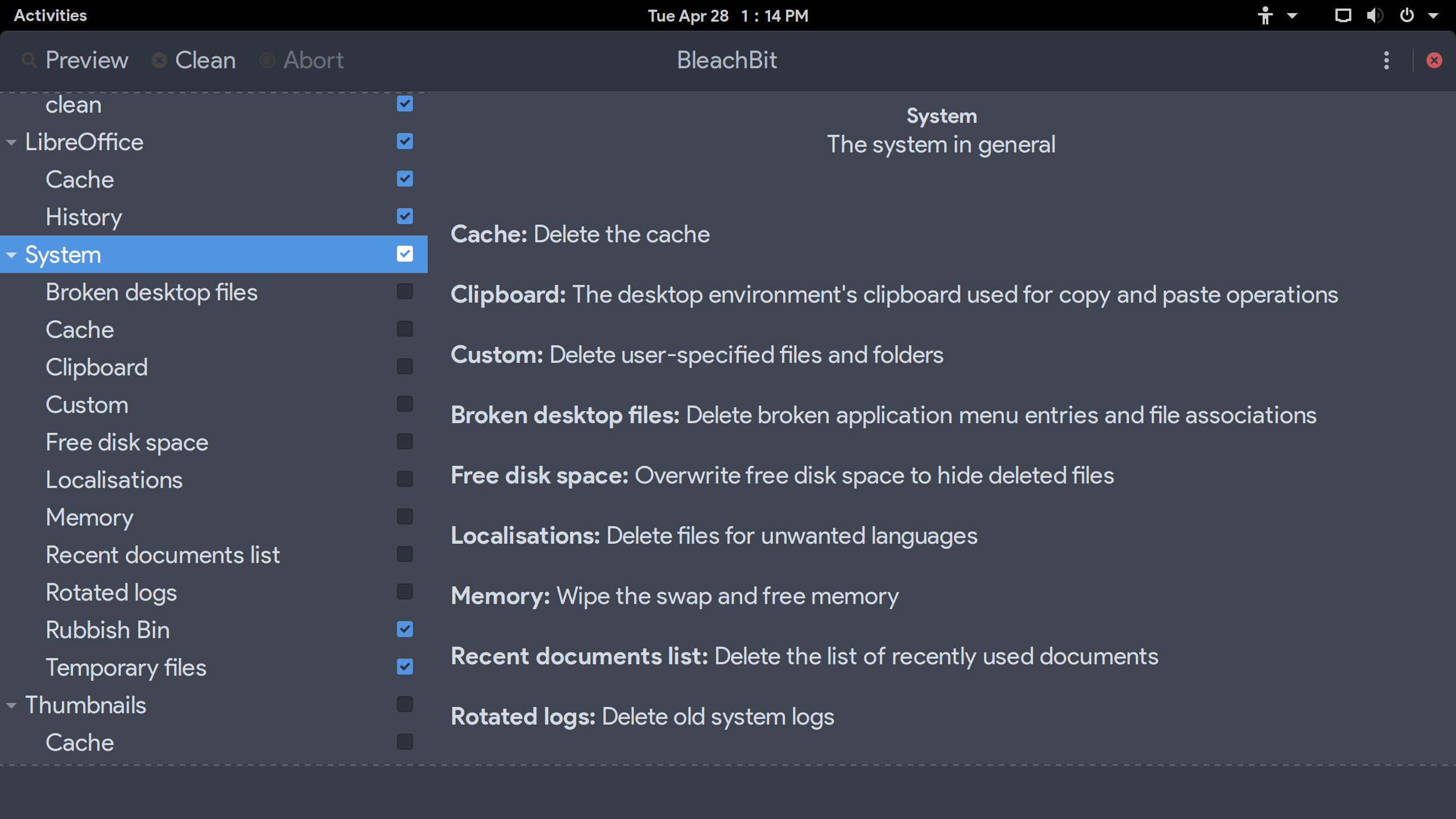
- Screenshot of the Bleachbit 4.0.0 User Interface on GNOME Shell
- Release: 24 December 2008; 17 years ago
- Stable release: 6.0.6 / 17 October 2026; 19 days ago
- Written in: Python
- Operating system: Windows macOS; Linux
- Size: 11.3–12.1 MB (Windows)
- Available in: 64 languages
- Type: Disk cleaner
- License: GNU General Public License
- Website: www.bleachbit.org
- Repository: github.com/bleachbit/bleachbit

BleachBit is a free and open-source disk space cleaner, privacy manager, and computer system optimizer. The BleachBit source code is licensed under the GNU General Public License version 3.

== History ==
BleachBit was first publicly released on 24 December 2008 for Linux systems. The 0.2.1 release created some controversy by suggesting Linux needed a registry cleaner.

Version 0.4.0 introduced CleanerML, a standards-based markup language for writing new cleaners. On May 29, 2009, BleachBit version 0.5.0 added support for Windows XP, Windows Vista, and Windows 7. On September 16, 2009, version 0.6.4 introduced command-line interface support.

== Technology ==
BleachBit is written in the Python programming language and uses PyGTK.

Most of BleachBit's cleaners are written in CleanerML, an open standard XML-based markup language for writing cleaners. CleanerML deals not only with deleting files, but also executes more specialized actions, such as vacuuming an SQLite database (used, for example, to clean Yum).

BleachBit's file shredder uses only a single, "secure" pass because its developers believe that there is a lack of evidence that multiple passes, such as the 35-pass Gutmann method, are more effective. They also assert that multiple passes are significantly slower and may give the user a false sense of security by overshadowing other ways in which privacy may be compromised.

== Hillary Clinton email controversy ==
Bleachbit was used to erase emails on Hillary Clinton's private server during her time as Secretary of State during the Obama administration.

In August 2016, Republican U.S. Congressman Trey Gowdy announced that he had seen notes from the Federal Bureau of Investigation (FBI), taken during an investigation of Clinton's emails, that stated that her staff had used BleachBit in order to delete tens of thousands of emails on her private server. Subsequently, then presidential nominee Donald Trump falsely claimed Clinton had “acid washed” and “bleached” her emails, calling it “an expensive process.”

After the announcement, BleachBit's company website reportedly received increased traffic.

== See also ==
- AVG PC TuneUp
- Desktop Cleanup Wizard
- Disk Cleanup
- Eraser (software)
- CCleaner
- Norton Utilities
