= Peter Gutmann (computer scientist) =

New Zealand computer scientist

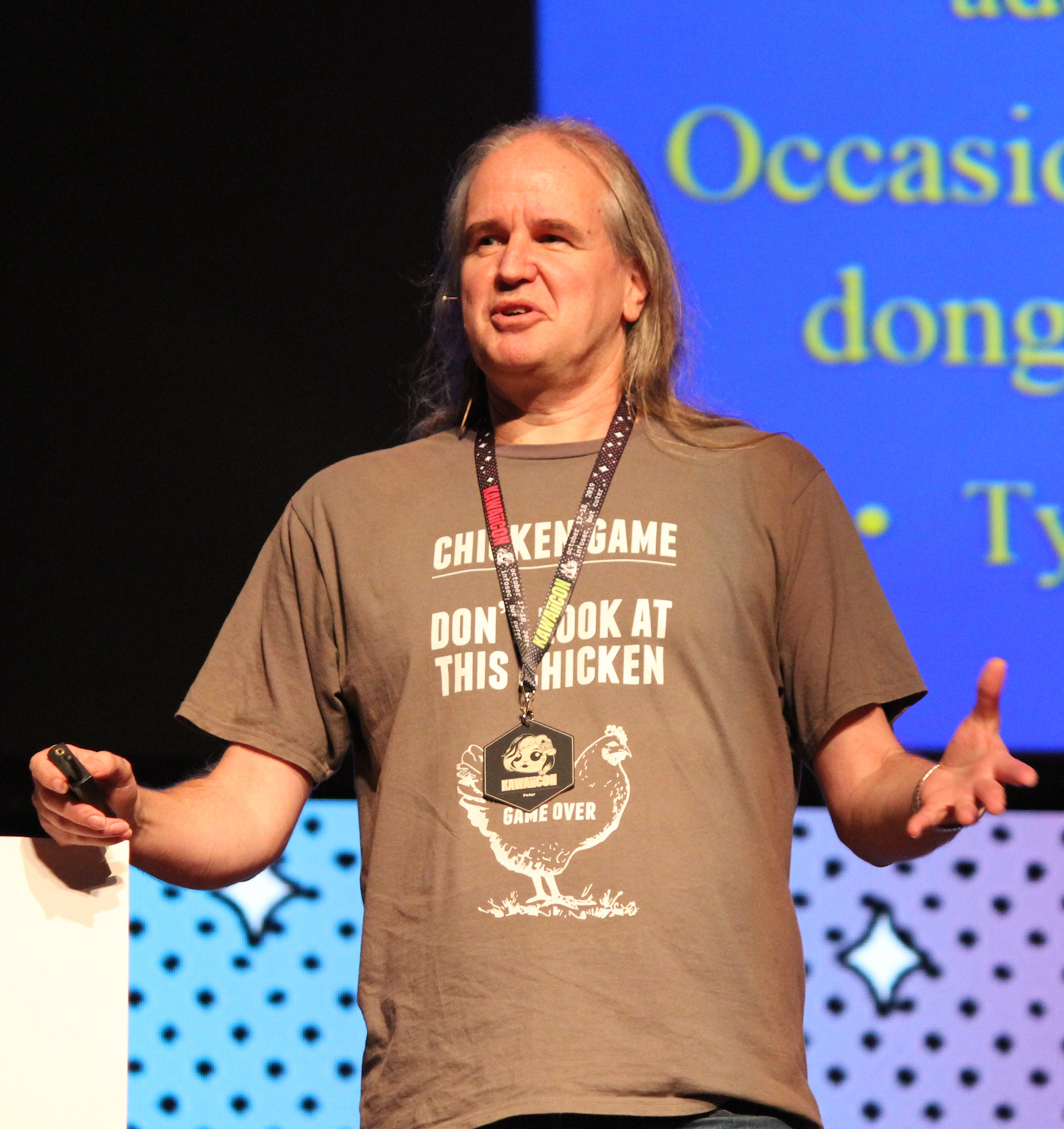
Gutmann speaking at Kawaiicon 2019

Peter Claus Gutmann is a computer scientist in the Department of Computer Science at the University of Auckland, Auckland, New Zealand. He has a Ph.D. in computer science from the University of Auckland. His Ph.D. thesis and a book based on the thesis were about a cryptographic security architecture. He is interested in computer security issues, including security architecture, security usability (or more usually the lack thereof), and hardware security; he has discovered several flaws in publicly released cryptosystems and protocols.

Gutmann is the developer of the cryptlib open source software security library and contributed to PGP version 2. In 1994 he developed the Secure FileSystem (SFS). He is also known for his analysis of data deletion on electronic memory media, magnetic and otherwise, and devised the Gutmann method for erasing data from a hard drive more or less securely. His 35-pass data overwriting method is based on a misunderstanding of how hard drives work and the encoding methods they use. These analyses have gained great popularity, although being based on early-90s magnetic recording technology which goes back to the 1970s or even earlier are no longer relevant today.

Having lived in New Zealand for some time, he has written on such subjects as weta (a group of insects endemic to New Zealand), and the Auckland power crisis of 1998, during which the electrical power system failed completely in the central city for five weeks, which he has blogged about. He has also written on his career as an "arms courier" for New Zealand, detailing the difficulties faced in complying with customs control regulations with respect to cryptographic products, which were once classed as "munitions" by various jurisdictions including the United States.

== Criticism of Windows Vista ==
His white paper "Cost Analysis of Windows Vista Content Protection", in which he described the content protection specification as "the longest suicide note in history", generated considerable public interest since it was first posted in 2006. He discussed this with Steve Gibson in episode #74 of the Security Now! podcast on 2007-01-11.

== See also ==
- Criticism of Windows Vista
- Data privacy
- Gutmann method
- Information privacy
- Plaintext

== Bibliography ==
- RFC 7366 – "Encrypt-then-MAC for Transport Layer Security (TLS) and Datagram Transport Layer Security (DTLS)," Proposed Standard.
- Gutmann, Peter (2014). Engineering Security (Book Draft April 2014) (PDF). Peter Gutmann, Book Draft published online.
- Gutmann, Peter (2003). Cryptographic Security Architecture: Design and Verification. Springer-Verlag. doi:10.1007/b97264. ISBN 0-387-95387-6. S2CID 27659379.
- Gutmann, Peter (2000). The Design and Verification of a Cryptographic Security Architecture (PhD). University of Auckland. hdl:2292/2310.
