= CCleaner =

Suite of utilities for cleaning disk and operating system environment

- Developer: Piriform Software
- Release: 23 September 2003; 22 years ago

Stable release(s) [±]
- Windows: 7.10.1464 / 29 July 2026; 25 days ago
- macOS: 2.09.187 / 19 October 2023; 2 years ago
- Android: 26.12.2 / 9 July 2026; 45 days ago
- iOS: 1.15.1 / 27 April 2026; 3 months ago
- Written in: C++
- Operating system: Windows 10 and later, macOS Sierra and later, Android 10 and later, iOS 16 and later
- Platform: IA-32 and x64
- Available in: 58 languages
- List of languages Albanian, Arabic, Armenian, Azeri (Latin), Belarusian, Bosnian, Brazilian Portuguese (Portugues do Brasil), Bulgarian, Burmese, Catalan (Catala), Chinese (Simplified), Chinese (Traditional), Corsican, Croatian (Hrvatski), Czech (Ceský), Danish, Dutch (Nederlands), English, Estonian (Eesti keel), Farsi, Finnish (Suomi), French (Français), Galician, Georgian, German (Deutsch), Greek, Hebrew, Hindi, Hungarian (Magyar), Indonesian, Italian (Italiano), Japanese, Kazakh, Korean, Kurdish, Latvian, Lithuanian (Lietuviu), Macedonian, Malaysian, Marathi, Mongolian, Norwegian, Polish (Polski), Portuguese (Portugues), Romanian (Romana), Russian, Serbian (Cyrillic), Serbian (Latin), Slovak, Slovenian, Spanish (Espanol), Swedish (Svenska), Tatar, Thai, Turkish (Türkçe), Turkmen, Ukrainian, Vietnamese.
- Type: Utility software
- License: Freemium for home use; commercial for use in organisations and institutions
- Website: www.ccleaner.com

CCleaner (/ˈsiːˌkliːnər/; originally meaning "Crap Cleaner"), developed by Piriform Software, is a utility used to clean potentially unwanted files and invalid Windows Registry entries from a computer. It is one of the longest-established system cleaners, first launched in 2004. It was originally developed for Microsoft Windows only, but in 2012, a macOS version was released. An Android version was released in 2014, and an iOS version was released nine years later.

== Features ==
CCleaner can delete potentially unwanted files left by certain programs, including Microsoft Edge, Internet Explorer, Firefox, Google Chrome, Opera, Safari, Windows Media Player, eMule, Google Toolbar, Netscape, Microsoft Office, Nero, Adobe Acrobat, McAfee, Adobe Flash Player, Sun Java, WinRAR, WinAce, WinZip and GIMP along with browsing history, cookies, recycle bin, memory dumps, file fragments, log files, system caches, application data, autocomplete form history, and various other data. The program includes a registry cleaner to locate and correct problems in the Windows registry, such as missing references to shared DLLs, unused registration entries for file extensions, and missing references to application paths. CCleaner 2.27 and later can wipe the MFT free space of a drive, or the entire drive.

CCleaner can uninstall programs or modify the list of programs that execute on startup. Since version 2.19, CCleaner can delete Windows System Restore points. CCleaner can also automatically update installed programs and computer drivers.

Piriform also distributes a web browser called CCleaner Browser, included as an optional add-on included within the CCleaner installer. The browser, built on Google's free and open-source project Chromium, includes built-in ad blocking and anti-tracking features. The browser is only available for Microsoft Windows. The browser is identical to Avast Secure Browser, which is also owned by Piriform's parent company, Gen Digital.

== History ==
CCleaner was first launched in 2004 for Microsoft Windows. It remained a Windows-only utility until 2012. On 2 June 2011, Piriform announced a public beta test program for CCleaner for Mac. The Mac version graduated to the test stage on 30 January 2012.

A commercial Network Edition was also introduced. Piriform released CCleaner for Android in 2014. Nine years later, the app was released for iOS via the Apple App Store.

On 6 October 2025, with the release of CCleaner 7 for Windows, it received a major UI overhaul, featuring a more modern interface, a universal dark mode, and support for ARM64 architecture. Version 7 also removes the options to close the software or to disallow it from running on startup.

== Critical reception ==
CNET editors gave the application a rating of 5/5 stars, calling it a 'must-have tool'. It was awarded Editor's Choice Award in April 2009 by CNET. In 2016 Piriform announced 2 billion CCleaner downloads worldwide. In January 2014 it had been the most popular software on FileHippo for more than a year, and had a 5-star editor's rating on Softpedia. CCleaner has been reviewed by Chip.de, TechRadar, PC Magazine and TechRepublic.

=== Data collection ===
Because of an error in the code, the Active Monitoring component of CCleaner 5.45, which was designed to measure junk levels to trigger cleaning, switched back on again. Piriform recognized this error and confirmed to users that the Active Monitoring feature did not report data. It then changed Active Monitoring to the more accurate title of 'Smart Cleaning'. After criticism later versions allowed data collection to be controlled separately by the user, although some data collection, such as OS and language, which is necessary for the app to be delivered, is still on by default as outlined in the company's Data Factsheet. Piriform states that the data collection is completely anonymous and is used to improve product quality.

=== Bundled software ===
Piriform was acquired by Avast in July 2017. In December 2018, it was reported that users installing CCleaner would also have Avast Antivirus installed without their permission, with TechSpot claiming this arguably made CCleaner no better than the malware it was supposed to defend against. Piriform denied this.

In July 2020, Microsoft Windows Defender began flagging the free version of CCleaner as a "potentially unwanted application", stating that "while the bundled applications themselves are legitimate, bundling of software, especially products from other providers, can result in unexpected software activity that can negatively impact user experiences." Piriform rolled out an update days later and third-party software installation is now optional when installing the program.

== Malware infection ==
After Piriform was acquired by Avast, in September 2017, CCleaner 5.33 was compromised by the incorporation of the Floxif trojan horse into the distributed program that could install a backdoor, enabling remote access to 2.27 million machines which had installed CCleaner. Avast claimed that the malware was already in CCleaner version 5.33, prior to the purchase of Piriform. Forty of the infected machines received a second-stage payload that appears to have targeted technology companies Samsung, Sony, Asus, Intel, VMWare, O2, Singtel, Gauselmann, Dyn, Chunghwa and Fujitsu. On 13 September, Piriform released CCleaner 5.34 and CCleaner Cloud 1.07.3191, without the malicious code.

On 21 October 2019, Avast disclosed a second security breach during which attackers tried again to insert malware inside CCleaner releases. The attempt was unsuccessful.

== See also ==
- BleachBit
- Malware
- Utility software
