= National Industrial Security Program =

US government program

The National Industrial Security Program, or NISP, is the nominal authority in the United States for managing the needs of private industry to access classified information.

The NISP was established in 1993 by Executive Order 12829. The National Security Council nominally sets policy for the NISP, while the Director of the Information Security Oversight Office is nominally the authority for implementation. Under the ISOO, the Secretary of Defense is nominally the Executive Agent, but the NISP recognizes four different Cognizant Security Agencies, all of which have equal authority: the Department of Defense, the Department of Energy, the Central Intelligence Agency, and the Nuclear Regulatory Commission.

Defense Counterintelligence and Security Agency administers the NISP on behalf of the Department of Defense and 34 other federal agencies.

== NISP Operating Manual (DoD 5220.22-M) ==
A major component of the NISP is the NISP Operating Manual, also called NISPOM, or DoD 5220.22-M. The NISPOM establishes the standard procedures and requirements for all government contractors, with regards to classified information. As of 2017, the current NISPOM edition is dated 28 Feb 2006. Chapters and selected sections of this edition are:

- Chapter 1 – General Provisions and Requirements
- Chapter 2 – Security Clearances
  - Section 1 – Facility Clearances
  - Section 2 – Personnel Security Clearances
  - Section 3 – Foreign Ownership, Control, or Influence (FOCI)
- Chapter 3 – Security Training and Briefings
- Chapter 4 – Classification and Marking
- Chapter 5 – Safeguarding Classified Information
- Chapter 6 – Visits and Meetings
- Chapter 7 – Subcontracting
- Chapter 8 – Information System Security
- Chapter 9 – Special Requirements
  - Section 1 – RD and FRD
  - Section 2 – DoD Critical Nuclear Weapon Design Information (CNWDI)
  - Section 3 – Intelligence Information
  - Section 4 – Communication Security (COMSEC)
- Chapter 10 – International Security Requirements
- Chapter 11 – Miscellaneous Information
  - Section 1 – TEMPEST
  - Section 2 – Defense Technical Information Center (DTIC)
  - Section 3 – Independent Research and Development (IR&D) Efforts
- Appendices

=== Data sanitization ===
DoD 5220.22-M is sometimes cited as a standard for sanitization to counter data remanence. The NISPOM actually covers the entire field of government–industrial security, of which data sanitization is a very small part (about two paragraphs in a 141-page document). Furthermore, the NISPOM does not actually specify any particular method. Standards for sanitization are left up to the Cognizant Security Authority. The Defense Security Service provides a Clearing and Sanitization Matrix (C&SM) which does specify methods. As of the June 2007 edition of the DSS C&SM, overwriting is no longer acceptable for sanitization of magnetic media; only degaussing or physical destruction is acceptable.
