= Gutmann method =

Algorithm for securely erasing computer hard drives

The Gutmann method is an algorithm for securely erasing the contents of computer hard disk drives, such as files. Devised by Peter Gutmann and Colin Plumb and presented in the paper Secure Deletion of Data from Magnetic and Solid-State Memory in July 1996, it involved writing a series of 35 patterns over the region to be erased.

The selection of patterns assumes that the user does not know the encoding mechanism used by the drive, so it includes patterns designed specifically for three types of drives. A user who knows which type of encoding the drive uses can choose only those patterns intended for their drive. A drive with a different encoding mechanism would need different patterns.

Most of the patterns in the Gutmann method were designed for older MFM/RLL-encoded disks. Gutmann himself has noted that more modern drives no longer use these older encoding techniques, making parts of the method irrelevant. He said "In the time since this paper was published, some people have treated the 35-pass overwrite technique described in it more as a kind of voodoo incantation to banish evil spirits than the result of a technical analysis of drive encoding techniques".

Since about 2001, some ATA IDE and SATA hard drive manufacturer designs include support for the ATA Secure Erase standard, obviating the need to apply the Gutmann method when erasing an entire drive. The Gutmann method does not apply to USB sticks: a 2011 study reports that 71.7% of data remained available. On solid state drives it resulted in 0.8–4.3% recovery.

== Background ==
The delete function in most operating systems simply marks the space occupied by the file as reusable (removes the pointer to the file) without immediately removing any of its contents. At this point the file can be fairly easily recovered by numerous recovery applications. However, once the space is overwritten with other data, there is no known way to use software to recover it. It cannot be done with software alone since the storage device only returns its current contents via its normal interface. Gutmann claims that intelligence agencies have sophisticated tools, including magnetic force microscopes, which together with image analysis, can detect the previous values of bits on the affected area of the media (for example hard disk). This claim however seems to be invalid based on the thesis "Data Reconstruction from a Hard Disk Drive using Magnetic Force Microscopy".

== Method ==
An overwrite session consists of a lead-in of four random write patterns, followed by patterns 5 to 31 (see rows of table below), executed in a random order, and a lead-out of four more random patterns.

Each of patterns 5 to 31 was designed with a specific magnetic media encoding scheme in mind, which each pattern targets. The drive is written to for all the passes even though the table below only shows the bit patterns for the passes that are specifically targeted at each encoding scheme. The result should obscure any data on the drive so that only the most advanced physical scanning (e.g., using a magnetic force microscope) of the drive is likely to be able to recover any data.

The series of patterns is as follows:

Gutmann overwrite method
Pass	Data written		Pattern written to disk for targeted encoding scheme		
Pass	In binary notation	In hex notation	(1,7) RLL	(2,7) RLL	MFM
1	(Random)	(Random)			
2	(Random)	(Random)			
3	(Random)	(Random)			
4	(Random)	(Random)			
5	01010101 01010101 01010101	55 55 55	100...		000 1000...
6	10101010 10101010 10101010	AA AA AA	00 100...		0 1000...
7	10010010 01001001 00100100	92 49 24		00 100000...	0 100...
8	01001001 00100100 10010010	49 24 92		0000 100000...	100 100...
9	00100100 10010010 01001001	24 92 49		100000...	00 100...
10	00000000 00000000 00000000	00 00 00	101000...	1000...	
11	00010001 00010001 00010001	11 11 11	0 100000...		
12	00100010 00100010 00100010	22 22 22	00000 100000...		
13	00110011 00110011 00110011	33 33 33	10...	1000000...	
14	01000100 01000100 01000100	44 44 44	000 100000...		
15	01010101 01010101 01010101	55 55 55	100...		000 1000...
16	01100110 01100110 01100110	66 66 66	0000 100000...	000000 10000000...	
17	01110111 01110111 01110111	77 77 77	100010...		
18	10001000 10001000 10001000	88 88 88	00 100000...		
19	10011001 10011001 10011001	99 99 99	0 100000...	00 10000000...	
20	10101010 10101010 10101010	AA AA AA	00 100...		0 1000...
21	10111011 10111011 10111011	BB BB BB	00 101000...		
22	11001100 11001100 11001100	CC CC CC	0 10...	0000 10000000...	
23	11011101 11011101 11011101	DD DD DD	0 101000...		
24	11101110 11101110 11101110	EE EE EE	0 100010...		
25	11111111 11111111 11111111	FF FF FF	0 100...	000 100000...	
26	10010010 01001001 00100100	92 49 24		00 100000...	0 100...
27	01001001 00100100 10010010	49 24 92		0000 100000...	100 100...
28	00100100 10010010 01001001	24 92 49		100000...	00 100...
29	01101101 10110110 11011011	6D B6 DB		0 100…	
30	10110110 11011011 01101101	B6 DB 6D		100…	
31	11011011 01101101 10110110	DB 6D B6		00 100…	
32	(Random)	(Random)			
33	(Random)	(Random)			
34	(Random)	(Random)			
35	(Random)	(Random)			

Encoded bits shown in bold are what should be present in the ideal pattern, although due to the encoding the complementary bit is actually present at the start of the track.

== Criticism ==
Daniel Feenberg of the National Bureau of Economic Research, an American private nonprofit research organization, criticized Gutmann's claim that intelligence agencies are likely to be able to read overwritten data, citing a lack of evidence for such claims. He finds that Gutmann cites one non-existent source and sources that do not actually demonstrate recovery, only partially-successful observations. The definition of "random" is also quite different from the usual one used: Gutmann expects the use of pseudorandom data with sequences known to the recovering side, not an unpredictable one such as a cryptographically secure pseudorandom number generator.

Nevertheless, some published government security procedures consider an overwritten disk to still be sensitive. Human factors and potential limitations in the overwriting software create a residual risk that is not considered acceptable at the highest security levels.

Gutmann himself has responded to some of these criticisms and also criticized how his algorithm has been abused in an epilogue to his original paper, in which he states:

In the time since this paper was published, some people have treated the 35-pass overwrite technique described in it more as a kind of voodoo incantation to banish evil spirits than the result of a technical analysis of drive encoding techniques. As a result, they advocate applying the voodoo to PRML and EPRML drives even though it will have no more effect than a simple scrubbing with random data. In fact performing the full 35-pass overwrite is pointless for any drive since it targets a blend of scenarios involving all types of (normally-used) encoding technology, which covers everything back to 30+-year-old MFM methods (if you don't understand that statement, re-read the paper). If you're using a drive which uses encoding technology X, you only need to perform the passes specific to X, and you never need to perform all 35 passes. For any modern PRML/EPRML drive, a few passes of random scrubbing is the best you can do. As the paper says, "A good scrubbing with random data will do about as well as can be expected". This was true in 1996, and is still true now.

— Peter Gutmann, Secure Deletion of Data from Magnetic and Solid-State Memory, University of Auckland Department of Computer Science

Gutmann's statement has been criticized for not recognizing that PRML/EPRML does not replace RLL, with critics claiming PRML/EPRML to be a signal detection method rather than a data encoding method. Polish data recovery service Kaleron has also claimed that Gutmann's publication contains further factual errors and assumptions that do not apply to actual disks.

== See also ==
- Data remanence
- Data recovery
- Computer forensics
