= PTK Forensics =

- Original author(s): DFLabs Inc
- Developer(s): DFLabs Inc
- Final release: version 2.0 (Jan 2009)
- Platform: LAMP
- Available in: JavaScript, PHP, Perl
- Type: Digital forensics
- License: Shareware/Commercial
- Website: http://ptk.dflabs.com/

PTK Forensics (PTK) was a non-free, commercial GUI for old versions of the digital forensics tool The Sleuth Kit (TSK). It also includes a number of other software modules for investigating digital media. The software is not developed anymore.

PTK runs as a GUI interface for The Sleuth Kit, acquiring and indexing digital media for investigation. Indexes are stored in an SQL database for searching as part of a digital investigation. PTK calculates a hash signature (using SHA-1 and MD5) for acquired media for verification and consistency purposes.
