= Open Computer Forensics Architecture =

- Developer: Korps landelijke politiediensten
- Final release: 2.2.0pl4
- Operating system: Linux
- Available in: English
- Type: Computer forensics
- Website: sourceforge.net/apps/trac/ocfa/wiki

The Open Computer Forensics Architecture (OCFA) is a distributed open-source computer forensics framework used to analyze digital media within a digital forensics laboratory environment. The framework was built by the Dutch national police.

The software was last updated in 2015.

== Architecture ==
OCFA consists of a back end for the Linux platform, it uses a PostgreSQL database for data storage, a custom Content-addressable storage or CarvFS based data repository, and a Lucene index. The front end for OCFA has not been made publicly available due to licensing issues.

The framework integrates with other open source forensic tools and includes modules for The Sleuth Kit, Scalpel, Photorec, libmagic, GNU Privacy Guard, objdump, exiftags, zip, 7-zip, tar, gzip, bzip2, rar, antiword, qemu-img, and mbx2mbox. OCFA is extensible in C++ or Java.

== See also ==
- List of digital forensics tools
