= Digital forensic process =

Process used in digital forensics investigations

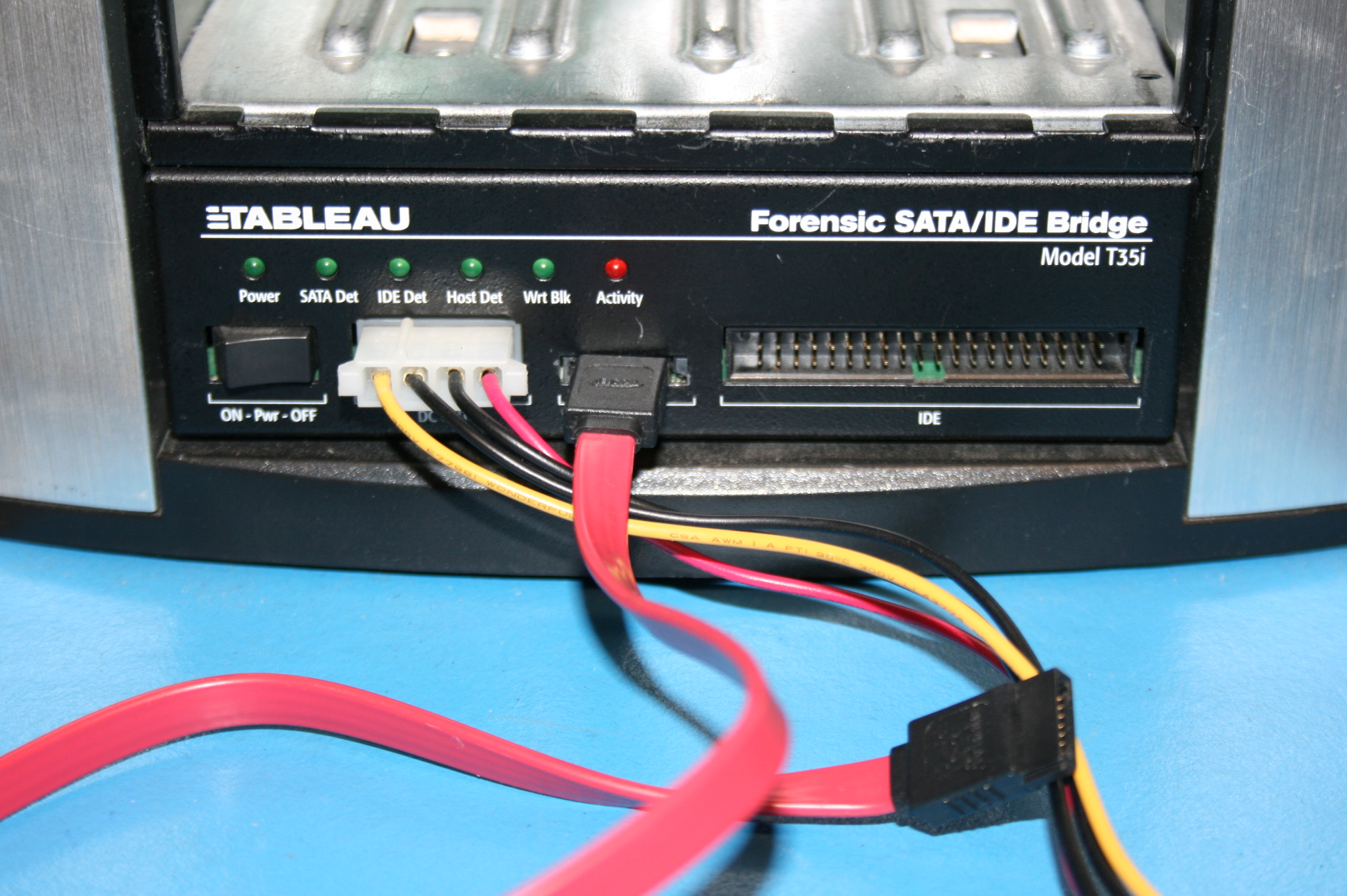
A Tableau forensic write blocker

The digital forensic process is a recognized scientific and forensic process used in digital forensics investigations. Forensics researcher Eoghan Casey defines it as a number of steps from the original incident alert through to reporting of findings. The process is predominantly used in computer and mobile forensic investigations and consists of three steps: acquisition, analysis and reporting.

Digital media seized for investigation may become an "exhibit" in legal terminology if it is determined to be 'reliable'. Investigators employ the scientific method to recover digital evidence to support or disprove a hypothesis, either for a court of law or in civil proceedings.

== Personnel ==
The stages of the digital forensics process require different specialist training and knowledge. There are two basic levels of personnel:

Digital forensic technician
Technicians gather or process evidence at crime scenes. These technicians are trained on the correct handling of technology (for example how to preserve the evidence). Technicians may be required to carry out "Live analysis" of evidence. Various tools to simplify this procedure have been produced, such as EnCase, Velociraptor and FTK.

Digital Evidence Examiners
Examiners specialize in one area of digital evidence; either at a broad level (i.e. computer or network forensics etc.) or as a sub-specialist (i.e. image analysis)

== Process models ==
There have been many attempts to develop a process model but so far none have been universally accepted. Part of the reason for this may be due to the fact that many of the process models were designed for a specific environment, such as law enforcement, and they therefore could not be readily applied in other environments such as incident response. This is a list of the main models since 2001 in chronological order:

- The Abstract Digital Forensic Model (Reith, et al., 2002)
- The Integrated Digital Investigative Process (Carrier & Spafford, 2003)
- An Extended Model of Cybercrime Investigations (Ciardhuain, 2004)
- The Enhanced Digital Investigation Process Model (Baryamureeba & Tushabe, 2004)
- The Digital Crime Scene Analysis Model (Rogers, 2004)
- A Hierarchical, Objectives-Based Framework for the Digital Investigations Process (Beebe & Clark, 2004)
- Framework for a Digital Investigation (Kohn, et al., 2006)
- The Four Step Forensic Process (Kent, et al., 2006)
- FORZA - Digital forensics investigation framework (Ieong, 2006)
- Process Flows for Cyber Forensics Training and Operations (Venter, 2006)
- The Common Process Model (Freiling & Schwittay, (2007)
- The Two-Dimensional Evidence Reliability Amplification Process Model (Khatir, et al., 2008)Two-Dimensional Evidence Reliability Amplification Process Model for Digital Forensics | Request PDF
- The Digital Forensic Investigations Framework (Selamat, et al., 2008)
- The Systematic Digital Forensic Investigation Model (SRDFIM) (Agarwal, et al., 2011)(PDF) Systematic Digital Forensic Investigation Model
- The Advanced Data Acquisition Model (ADAM): A process model for digital forensic practice (Adams, 2012) Research Portal

== Seizure ==
Prior to the actual examination, digital media will be seized. In criminal cases this will often be performed by law enforcement personnel trained as technicians to ensure the preservation of evidence. In civil matters it will usually be a company officer, often untrained. Various laws cover the seizure of material. In criminal matters, law related to search warrants is applicable. In civil proceedings, the assumption is that a company is able to investigate their own equipment without a warrant, so long as the privacy and human rights of employees are preserved.

== Acquisition ==
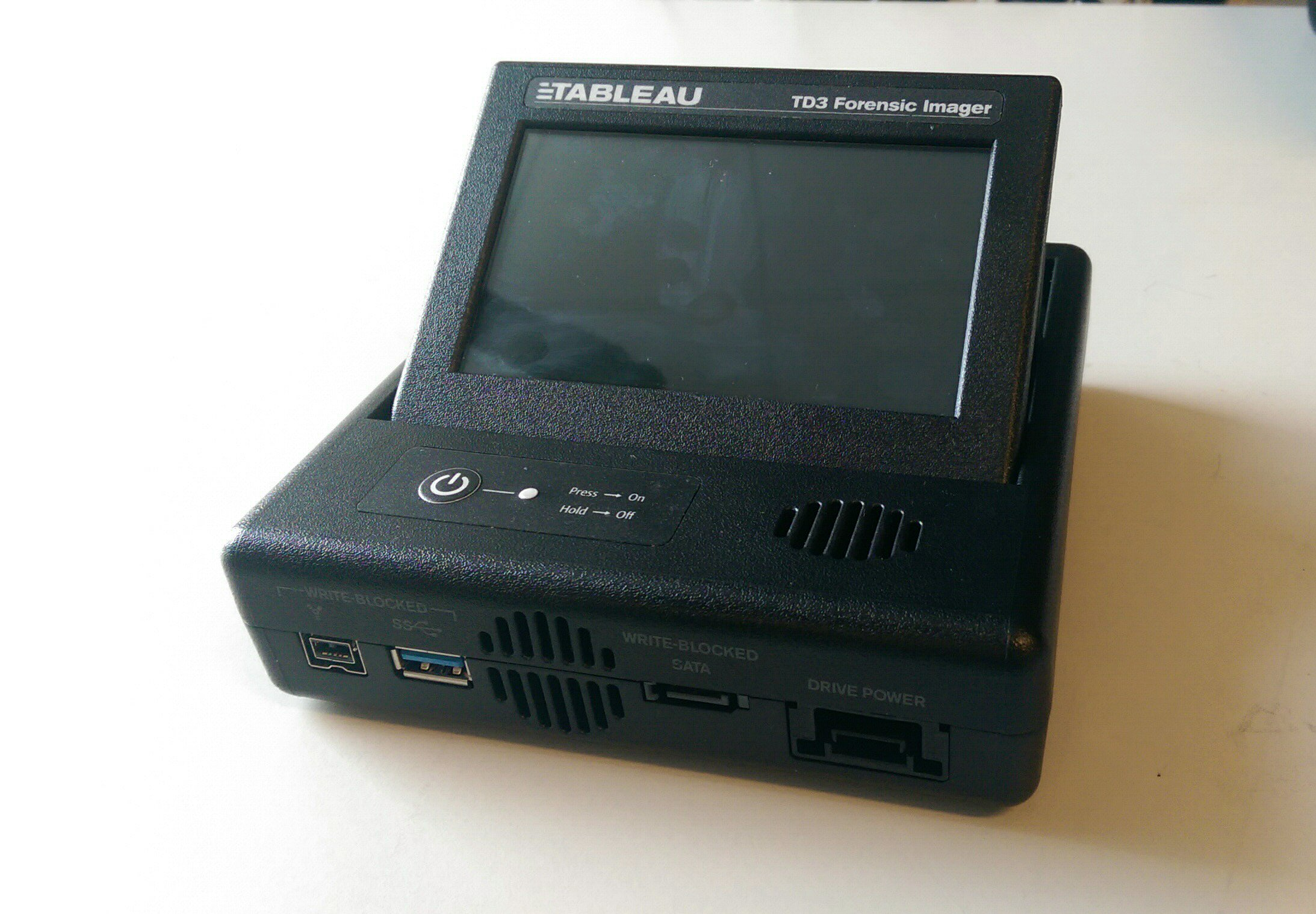
Example of a portable disk imaging device

Once exhibits have been seized, an exact sector level duplicate (or "forensic duplicate") of the media is created, usually via a write blocking device. The duplication process is referred to as Imaging or Acquisition. The duplicate is created using a hard-drive duplicator or software imaging tools such as DCFLdd, IXimager, Guymager, TrueBack, EnCase, FTK Imager or FDAS. The original drive is then returned to secure storage to prevent tampering.

The acquired image is verified by using the SHA-1 or MD5 hash functions. At critical points throughout the analysis, the media is verified again to ensure that the evidence is still in its original state. The process of verifying the image with a hash function is called "hashing."

Given the problems associated with imaging large drives, multiple networked computers, file servers that cannot be shut down and cloud resources new techniques have been developed that combine digital forensic acquisition and ediscovery processes.

== Analysis ==
After acquisition the contents of (the HDD) image files are analysed to identify evidence that either supports or contradicts a hypothesis or for signs of tampering (to hide data). In 2002 the International Journal of Digital Evidence referred to this stage as "an in-depth systematic search of evidence related to the suspected crime". By contrast Brian Carrier, in 2006, describes a more "intuitive procedure" in which obvious evidence is first identified after which "exhaustive searches are conducted to start filling in the holes"

During the analysis an investigator usually recovers evidence material using a number of different methodologies (and tools), often beginning with recovery of deleted material. Examiners use specialist tools (EnCase, ILOOKIX, FTK, etc.) to aid with viewing and recovering data. The type of data recovered varies depending on the investigation, but examples include email, chat logs, images, internet history or documents. The data can be recovered from accessible disk space, deleted (unallocated) space or from within operating system cache files.

Various types of techniques are used to recover evidence, usually involving some form of keyword searching within the acquired image file, either to identify matches to relevant phrases or to filter out known file types. Certain files (such as graphic images) have a specific set of bytes which identify the start and end of a file. If identified, a deleted file can be reconstructed. Many forensic tools use hash signatures to identify notable files or to exclude known (benign) files; acquired data is hashed and compared to pre-compiled lists such as the Reference Data Set (RDS) from the National Software Reference Library

On most media types, including standard magnetic hard disks, once data has been securely deleted it can never be recovered.

Once evidence is recovered the information is analysed to reconstruct events or actions and to reach conclusions, work that can often be performed by less specialized staff. Digital investigators, particularly in criminal investigations, have to ensure that conclusions are based upon data and their own expert knowledge. In the US, for example, Federal Rules of Evidence state that a qualified expert may testify "in the form of an opinion or otherwise" so long as:

(1) the testimony is based upon sufficient facts or data, (2) the testimony is the product of reliable principles and methods, and (3) the witness has applied the principles and methods reliably to the facts of the case.

== Reporting ==
When an investigation is completed the information is often reported in a form suitable for non-technical individuals. Reports may also include audit information and other meta-documentation.

When completed, reports are usually passed to those commissioning the investigation, such as law enforcement (for criminal cases) or the employing company (in civil cases), who will then decide whether to use the evidence in court. Generally, for a criminal court, the report package will consist of a written expert conclusion of the evidence as well as the evidence itself (often presented on digital media).
