= Basis Technology =

American text analytics company

BasisTech
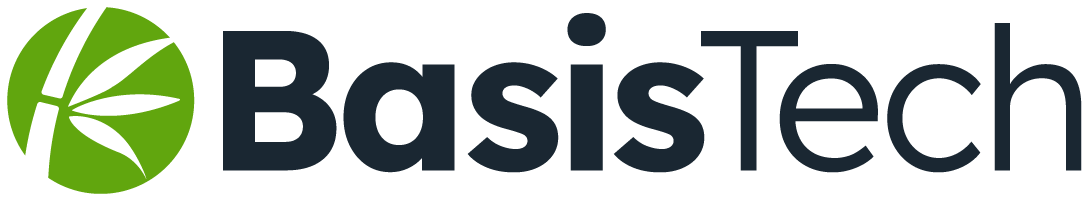
- Type: Private
- Industry: Information technology Information access Digital forensics Transliteration
- Founded: 1995
- Headquarters: Somerville, Massachusetts, United States
- Area served: Americas; Europe; Asia
- Key people: Carl Hoffman (CEO, Co-Founder); Steven Cohen (Co-Founder/Entrepreneur in Residence); Simson Garfinkel (Chief Scientist); Junichi Hasegawa (VP Asia); Aaron Bacon; Chris Blow
- Subsidiaries: BasisTech GK
- Website: http://www.basistech.com http://www.basistech.jp

BasisTech is a software company specializing in applying artificial intelligence techniques to understanding documents and unstructured data written in different languages. It has headquarters in Somerville, Massachusetts with a subsidiary office in Tokyo. Its legal name is BasisTech LLC.

The company was founded in 1995 by graduates of the Massachusetts Institute of Technology to use artificial intelligence techniques for natural language processing to help computer systems understand written human language. Its software focuses on analyzing freeform text so that applications can do a better job understanding the meaning of the words. For example, their software can identify tokens, part-of-speech, and lemmas.

Their software also performs entity extraction.

BasisTech was once known for its Rosette product which uses Natural Language Processing techniques to improve information retrieval, text mining, search engines and other applications. The tool is used to enable search engines to search in multiple languages, and match identities and dates. Rosette was sold to Babel Street in 2022.

BasisTech is repeating the same model, developing new technologies and then merging them with other companies. They bring in entrepreneurs to refine ideas, assemble teams, and access capital. Their focus is primarily upon early-stage technology ventures with global potential.

== Notable Companies ==
- MetaSearch — Merged with Diffeo 2017
- Diffeo — Acquired by Salesforce in 2019
- Rosette — Acquired by Babel Street in 2022
- Recorded Future — Acquired by Insight Partners in 2017, Acquired by Mastercard in 2024
- KonaSearch — Acquired by Bullhorn in 2024

== Notable Investments ==
- Heven Aerotech — Hydrogen powered drones and software. $1B valuation Nov 2025.
- Helix Carbon — Recycles industrial waste streams. BasisTech was first check-in, expecting Series A in 2026.
- Multitude Insights — Twitter for police. Fantastic growth, announcement coming soon.
- Onava — AI powered biotech. Backed by Fifty Years.
- Solid — Competitor to Lovable and Base44. Successful product hunt launch, fast growth

== Rosette ==
Rosette comes as a cloud (public or on-premise) deployment or Java SDK. Rosette provides a variety of natural language processing tools for unstructured text: language identification, base linguistics, entity extraction, name matching, name translation, sentiment analysis, semantic similarity, relationship extraction, topic extraction, categorization, and Arabic chat translation. It can be integrated into applications to enhance financial compliance onboarding, communication surveillance compliance, social media monitoring, cyber threat intelligence, and customer feedback analysis.

The Rosette Linguistics Platform is composed of these modules:

- Rosette Language Identifier looks at the structural and statistical signature of the file to identify the language. The pre-configured software can recognize 55 different languages with 45 different encodings.
- Rosette Base Linguistics identifies the lemma or word stem after finding the tokens. Search is often faster and more accurate when words are grouped by their stem.
- Rosette Entity Extractor analyzes raw text and identifies the probable role that words and phrases play in the document, a key step that makes it possible for algorithms to distinguish between the various meanings that many words can have. Splitting the raw text into groups of words according to their role and then classifying their contribution to meaning is often called entity analysis. The Basis hybrid approach mixes statistical modeling with rules, regular expressions, and gazetteers, lists of special words that can be tuned to the language and text to be analyzed. The tool is designed to work directly with varied alphabets and multiple languages, an advantage because foreign words are often transliterated in multiple ways. It is believed to be the first commercially available tool for analyzing Arabic text.
- Rosette Name Translator transliterates non-Latin alphabets like Arabic into a consistent Latin form.
- Rosette Name Indexer enables simple search across name variations either by plugging into open source search engines or as a standalone service.
- Rosette Core Library for Unicode smooths the use of Unicode text.
- Rosette Chat Translator for Arabic converts words from the Arabic chat alphabet to Arabic.

Rosette is used in both the United States government offices to support translation and by major Internet infrastructure firms like search engines.

== Digital forensics ==
BasisTech develops open-source digital forensics tools, The Sleuth Kit and Autopsy, to help identify and extract clues from data storage devices like hard disks or flash cards, as well as devices such as smart phones and iPods. The open-source licensing model allows them to be used as the foundation for larger projects like a Hadoop-based tool for massively parallel forensic analysis of very large data collections.

The digital forensics tool set is used to perform analysis of file systems, new media types, new file types and file system metadata. The tools can search for particular patterns in the files allowing it to target significant files or usage profiles.
