= Luisa Verdoliva =

Italian computer scientist

Annalisa (Luisa) Verdoliva (born 1972) is an Italian engineer whose research concerns image processing and digital forensics of multimedia data, including the detection of deepfakes and other AI-generated imagery. She is a professor in the Department of Industrial Engineering at the University of Naples Federico II, where she directs the Multimedia Forensics Lab.

Verdoliva was born in 1972, and earned a laurea in telecommunications engineering from the University of Naples Federico II. She chaired the IEEE Information Forensics and Security Technical Committee from 2021 to 2022, and was named to a government task force on fake news in 2020.

She was named an IEEE Fellow, in the 2021 class of fellows, "for contribution to multimedia forensics".
