= Forensics (disambiguation) =

Forensics is the application of science to criminal and civil laws.

It may also refer to:

- Public speaking
- Debate
- Computer forensics
