= OCFA =

OCFA may refer to:

- Odd-chain fatty acid
- Orange County Fire Authority
- Open Computer Forensics Architecture
