= AccessData =

Defunct American software company

- Industry: Cyber Security
- Founded: 1987
- Founder: Eric Thompson
- Defunct: December 2020
- Headquarters: Lindon, United States
- Parent: Exterro
- Website: www.accessdata.com

AccessData was a software development company that developed Forensic Toolkit (FTK) and FTK Imager until it was acquired by Exterro. It had over 130,000 customers in law enforcement, private companies, and government agencies.

== History ==
AccessData was founded in 1987 by Eric Thompson.

On 1 January 2015, AccessData split into two companies. The first company retained the name and digital forensics products whilst the second company, Resolution1 Security, split to focus on cyber incident response products. On 15 May 2015, AccessData announced that the sale of Resolution1 Security had been completed.

In December 2020, AccessData was acquired by Exterro. It was reported that Exterro paid over $100 million USD to purchase the company.

== Products ==
=== Forensic Toolkit (FTK) ===
Forensic Toolkit, or FTK, is a computer forensics software that scans a hard drive looking for various information. It is a well-known and widely used piece of software amongst those working in digital forensics. It can, for example, locate deleted emails and scan disks for strings to use them as a password dictionary to crack encryption or hashes. AccessData also created a similar tool called AD Lab.

=== FTK Imager ===
FTK Imager is a tool that saves an image of a hard disk in one file or in segments that may be later reconstructed. It calculates MD5 and SHA1 hash values and can verify the integrity of the data imaged is consistent with the created forensic image. The forensic image can be saved in several formats, including DD/raw, E01, and AD1. FTK Imager can be used to create hard disk images for later use in Forensic Toolkit,
