= Guidance Software =

Guidance Software, Inc.
- Type: Subsidiary
- Industry: Digital Forensics, E-Discovery
- Founded: 1997; 29 years ago
- Headquarters: Pasadena, California
- Area served: Worldwide
- Products: List: EnCase Analytics EnCase Enterprise EnCase eDiscovery EnCase Cybersecurity EnCase Forensic EnCase Portable Tableau Forensic
- Revenue: US $91.9 million (2010)
- Number of employees: 371
- Parent: OpenText
- Website: www.guidancesoftware.com

Guidance Software, Inc. was an American digital forensics company founded in 1997 by Shawn McCreight. Headquartered in Pasadena, California, the company developed and provided software for digital investigations in the United States, Europe, the Middle East, Africa, and the Asia/Pacific Rim. Guidance Software had offices in Brazil, Chicago, Houston, New York City, San Francisco, Singapore, United Kingdom and Washington, D.C., and employed approximately 371 employees. On September 14, 2017, the company was acquired by OpenText.

== Products and services ==
Best known for its EnCase digital investigations software, Guidance Software's product line was organized around four markets: digital forensics, endpoint security analytics, cyber security incident response, and e-discovery. The company served law-enforcement and government agencies, as well as corporations in various industries, such as financial and insurance services, technology, defense contracting, telecom, pharmaceutical, healthcare, manufacturing, and retail. The company operated through four business segments: products, professional services, training and maintenance, and operates two certification programs for the EnCase Certified Examiner (EnCE) and EnCase Certified eDiscovery Practitioner (EnCEP) designations. In May 2010, the company completed the acquisition of Tableau, LLC. In February 2012, Guidance Software acquired CaseCentral.

== Notable case mentions ==
Guidance Software has been noted in a number of high-profile use cases. In 2002, Guidance Software's EnCase was used in the murder trial of David Westerfield to examine his computers and disks to connect him to child pornography. That same year, EnCase was used by French police to uncover emails from now-convicted shoe bomber Richard Colvin Reid.

In 2004, EnCase software was used in the trial of now convicted Scott Peterson for the murder of his wife, Laci Peterson. Computer forensic experts used EnCase to examine Peterson's five computer hard drives, which provided valuable evidence that he had shopped online for a boat, studied water currents, bought a gift for his mistress in the weeks leading up to his wife's death and showed interest in a computer map that included Brooks Island, where his wife was later found.

In 2005, American serial killer Dennis Lynn Rader (also known as the BTK killer) sent a floppy disk to FOX affiliate KSAS-TV in Wichita, Kansas. Using EnCase, police were able to find metadata embedded in a deleted Microsoft Word document that was, unbeknownst to Rader, on the disk. The metadata contained "Christ Lutheran Church", and the document was marked as last modified by "Dennis." A search of the church website turned up Dennis Rader as president of the congregation council. Police began surveillance of Rader.

In 2011, following Sony Online Entertainment's multiple security breaches, Sony said it would be working with Data Forté, Guidance Software and Protiviti to resolve its PlayStation breach. And in May 2011, after the killing of Osama bin Laden, it was reported that an assault team of Navy SEALs removed computers, hard drives, USB sticks and DVDs from bin Laden's compound for forensic analysis. Based on a job description supporting the task, Guidance Software's EnCase is believed to be the tool selected for analysis of the electronic gear. Later that year, Guidance Software's EnCase was noted as a forensic software tool used in the trial of Casey Anthony, following the death of her daughter Caylee Anthony. Investigators used EnCase to search digital cameras and computers. Using the software, Detective Sandra Osborne of Orange County Sheriff's Department, found correctly and incorrectly spelled searches for the word “chloroform.”
