= Wv (software) =

wvWare
- Developer(s): Caolán McNamara
- Stable release: 1.2.4 / October 25, 2006
- Operating system: Cross-platform
- Size: 615 KB
- License: GPL
- Website: https://wvware.sourceforge.net/

The software library wv, also known as wvware or by its previous name mswordview, is a set of free software programs licensed under the GNU General Public License which can be used for viewing and/or converting files in the Microsoft .doc format to plain text, LaTeX, HTML or other formats.

The wv library provides several tools on the command line of a Unix shell, such as wvText for converting a .doc file to a plain text file. It is used by the program abiword, which provides a GUI interface for reading .doc files.

== See also ==
- Antiword
