= NUbuntu =

nUbuntu
- nUbuntu
- Developer: Brendan Almonte, Emanuele Gentili, Jayson Beitler
- OS family: Linux
- Working state: Discontinued
- Source model: Open source
- Latest release: 8.12 / December 16, 2008
- Kernel type: Linux (Unix-like)
- Default user interface: Fluxbox
- License: Mainly GNU / Various
- Official website: www.nubuntu.org (Closed)

nUbuntu or Network Ubuntu was a project to take the existing Ubuntu operating system LiveCD and Full Installer and remaster it with tools needed for penetration testing servers and networks. The main idea is to keep Ubuntu's ease of use and mix it with popular penetration testing tools. Besides usage for network and server testing, nUbuntu will be made to be a desktop distribution for advanced Linux users.

== Contents ==
nUbuntu uses the light window manager Fluxbox.

It includes some of the most used security programs for Linux, such as Wireshark, nmap, dSniff, and Ettercap.

== History ==
- 2005-12-18 - nUbuntu Project is born, developers release Testing 1
- 2006-01-16 - nUbuntu Live developers release Stable 1
- 2006-06-26 - nUbuntu Live developers release version 6.06
- 2006-10-16 - nUbuntu featured in Hacker Japan, a Japanese Hacker Magazine
- 2006-11-21 - nUbuntu Live developers release version 6.10

As of April 4, 2010, the official website is closed with no explanation.

=== Releases ===
Below is a list of previous and current releases.

Version	Release date	Release name
Stable 1	2006-01-16	nUbuntu Live
Stable	2006-06-26	6.06
Stable	2006-11-21	6.10
Alpha	2008-07-16	8.04
Alpha	2008-10-30	8.10
Beta	2008-12-17	8.12 Instigating Insecurity
