= Antiword =

Software reader

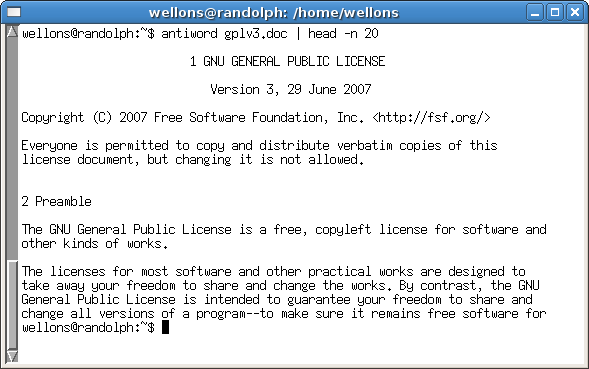
- Antiword displaying the GPL from a Word document with head
- Developer: Adri van Os
- Stable release: 0.37 / October 21, 2005
- Repository: antiword on GitHub
- Operating system: Cross-platform
- License: GPL
- Website: www.winfield.demon.nl

Antiword is a free software reader for proprietary Microsoft Word documents, and is available for most computer platforms. Antiword can convert the documents from Microsoft Word version 2, 6, 7, 97, 2000, 2002 and 2003 to plain text, PostScript, PDF, and XML/DocBook (experimental).

== Overview ==
The Word format is proprietary and only officially supported on Microsoft Windows and Macintosh operating systems. Reading the format on other systems can be difficult or impossible. Antiword was created to support reading this format on these systems.

Using the plain text output of Antiword, a Word document can be processed and filtered using shell scripts traditional text tools such as diff and grep. It can also be used to filter Word document spam.

Development has stagnated and no official release has been made since 2005.

As of 2024, the web site www.winfield.demon.nl has disappeared. However, a copy of the source code is now available as antiword on GitHub.

== See also ==
- wv – library for converting Microsoft Word files.
- Office Image Extraction Wizard
