= WindowsSCOPE =

Memory forensics and reverse engineering product

- Developer: WindowsSCOPE
- Platform: Windows, Cloud
- Available in: English
- Type: Computer forensics, Reverse Engineering
- Website: http://www.windowsscope.com

WindowsSCOPE is a memory forensics and reverse engineering product for Windows used for acquiring and analyzing volatile memory. One of its uses is in the detection and reverse engineering of rootkits and other malware. WindowsSCOPE supports acquisition and analysis of Windows computers running Windows XP through Windows 10.

== Acquisition ==
WindowsSCOPE supports both software-based acquisition as well as hardware-assisted methods for both locked and unlocked computers. WindowsSCOPE add-on hardware for memory acquisition uses the PCI Express bus for direct access to system memory. Memory snapshots acquired with WindowsSCOPE are stored in a repository. Memory snapshots in the repository can be compared to track changes in the system over time.

== Analysis ==
WindowsSCOPE shows processes, DLLs, and drivers running the computer at the time of the memory snapshot as well as open network sockets, file handles, and registry key handles. It also provides disassembly and control-flow graphing for executable code. WindowsSCOPE Live is a version of the tool that allows analysis to be performed from a mobile device.
