= Forensic Toolkit =

Software for computer forensics

- Developer: Exterro
- Stable release: 8.0 SP2
- Operating system: Windows
- Available in: English
- Type: Digital forensics
- Website: www.exterro.com/digital-forensics-software/ftk-forensic-toolkit

Forensic Toolkit, or FTK, is computer forensics software originally developed by AccessData, and now owned and actively developed by Exterro. It scans a hard drive looking for various information. It can, for example, potentially locate deleted emails and scan a disk for text strings to use them as a password dictionary to crack encryption.

FTK is also associated with a standalone disk imaging program called FTK Imager. This tool saves an image of a hard disk in one file or in segments that may be later on reconstructed. It calculates MD5 and SHA1 hash values and can verify the integrity of the data imaged is consistent with the created forensic image. The forensic image can be saved in several formats, including DD/raw, E01, and AD1.
