= Information discovery =

Term used in legal and corporate context

Information Discovery is a term used in the legal and corporate industry which refers to the steps involved in distilling a corporation's data corpus down to the most pertinent evidence pertaining to a court-related matter or compliance directive. The major information discovery steps include: managing the entire data collection in a manner to identify all pertinent evidence associated with the matter, targeting that information for collection (forensically or otherwise), processing and identification (culling) of relevant data, and processing for document hosting and legal document/information review.

Global organizations deal with legal discovery and disclosure request for electronically stored information “ESI” and paper documents on a regular basis. The massive emergence of evidence in electronic format, and the emergence of entirely new forms of evidence, present a number of cultural, practical, and legal challenges to both corporations and their law firms. Managing the massive amounts of information involved in a legal matter can sometimes be tedious and expensive.

Information Discovery although a similar term for manage document review (attorney document review, document review) and/or Electronic Discovery (e-Discovery, eDiscovery) is more encompassing to the entire process involved in identifying relevant information within a legal matter.

A number of software tools and service providers exist today that assist in and help facilitate the process of information discovery including early case assessment “ECA” tools, hosting platforms, cloud services, and managed document review firms. Corporations are also looking at ways to defray the expense associated with information discovery by looking at bringing solutions in-house or by insourcing through a third party service provider oftentimes requiring customization for the client involved.

== See also ==
- Knowledge discovery
- Legal governance, risk management, and compliance
- Early Case Assessment
- Sedona Canada Principles
