= FrontPoint Partners =

Former American hedge fund

- Type: Private company (subsidiary)
- Industry: Financial services
- Founded: November 2000
- Defunct: 2011
- Headquarters: Greenwich, Connecticut, United States
- Key people: Steve Eisman (portfolio manager); Chip Skowron (portfolio manager)
- Products: Hedge fund
- AUM: $7 billion (November 2010)
- Parent: Morgan Stanley

FrontPoint Partners was a hedge fund that became well known for its bet against subprime mortgages during the 2008 financial crisis under Steve Eisman. It was based in Greenwich, Connecticut, with other offices in New York and London.

FrontPoint was a registered investment adviser in the United States and was a wholly owned subsidiary of investment bank Morgan Stanley. An investigation into the Healthcare portfolio manager at the end of 2010 and early 2011 was the beginning of the end for Frontpoint. In August 2011, Frontpoint portfolio manager Chip Skowron pleaded guilty to insider trading and obstruction of justice. The other teams and portfolio managers (Eisman included) had nothing to do with the healthcare team and had no part in the insider trading. As a result of the investigation, investors withdrew funds and the firm shut down most of its investments in 2011.

Morgan Stanley filed a civil lawsuit against Skowron in 2012, calling Skowron a “faithless servant”. In 2013, Judge Shira Scheindlin of the U.S District Court of the Southern District of New York ruled on a motion for summary judgment that Skowron must forfeit $31 million—100% of the compensation he earned from the firm between 2007 and 2010—to his employer, Morgan Stanley.

== History ==
Frontpoint was founded in November 2000 by three principals, including two Tiger cubs. Morgan Stanley purchased an equity position in the company in 2006, when Frontpoint had $5.5 billion in assets under management. Frontpoint became an indirect wholly owned subsidiary of Morgan Stanley.

Steve Eisman served as a fund manager for FrontPoint Partners from 2004 until 2011. In October 2010, it was announced that Morgan Stanley, while maintaining a minority position, had handed control back to the managers of the firm. In November 2010, the firm was managing $7 billion.

In April 2011, the Securities and Exchange Commission filed a complaint against Frontpoint portfolio manager Chip Skowron for trading on inside information and named six Frontpoint funds as relief defendants. In April 2011, Frontpoint agreed to pay the SEC more than $30 million in settlement of charges against Frontpoint. In August 2011, Skowron pleaded guilty in federal court in Manhattan to conspiracy to engage in insider trading and obstruction of justice. Skowron was sent to prison for five years.

Morgan Stanley filed a separate civil lawsuit against Skowron in October 2012, seeking the $33 million it paid the SEC, as well as the entire $32 million it had paid Skowron in compensation from 2007 to 2010. In its lawsuit, Morgan Stanley called Skowron a “faithless servant” who lied repeatedly to continue being paid by Morgan Stanley and to avoid a blow to his reputation. A. Jeff Ifrah, co-author of Federal Sentencing for Business Crimes, said: "The reputation of an employer like this one can get killed by the conduct of its employee," and seeking restitution "is certainly a good strategy" to recover a company's good reputation. In December 2013, Judge Shira Scheindlin of the U.S District Court of the Southern District of New York ruled on a motion for summary judgment that Skowron must forfeit $31 million—100% of the compensation he earned from the firm between 2007 and 2010—to his employer, Morgan Stanley. The judge applied the legal doctrine of "faithless servant" to require Skowron to return his ill-gotten gains from the use of inside information to his employer, because he had engaged in insider trading, in violation of the firm's code of ethics, and failed to report his insider trading to the company.

In May 2011, Frontpoint announced that it would shut down most of its funds by the end of the month.
