= Scheindlin =

Scheindlin is a surname. Notable people with the name include:

- Dahlia Scheindlin, American-Israeli journalist
- Shira Scheindlin (born 1946), American judge
