= Steve Eisman =

American businessman and investor (born 1962)

- Born: Steven Eisman; July 8, 1962 (age 64)
- Education: University of Pennsylvania (BA); Harvard Law School (JD)
- Occupations: Managing Director and Portfolio Manager at Neuberger Berman
- Known for: Betting against subprime mortgages during the subprime mortgage crisis
- Spouse: Valerie Feigen (m. 1989)

Steven Eisman (/ˈaɪzmən/ EYEZ-mən; born July 8, 1962) is an American businessman and investor known for having shorted collateralized debt obligations (CDOs), thereby profiting from the collapse of the U.S. housing bubble in 2007–2008.

== Early life, education, and family ==
Eisman grew up in New York City, where he attended Yeshiva schools. He attended the University of Pennsylvania, graduating magna cum laude in 1984. He then graduated from Harvard Law School with honors. His parents worked in finance; they were brokers for Oppenheimer Holdings. Eisman was unhappy with his work in law. His parents arranged a position for him at Oppenheimer working as an equity analyst. Oppenheimer's anti-nepotism rules required his parents Elliott and Lillian to pay the first year of his salary.

== Career ==
=== FrontPoint Partners ===
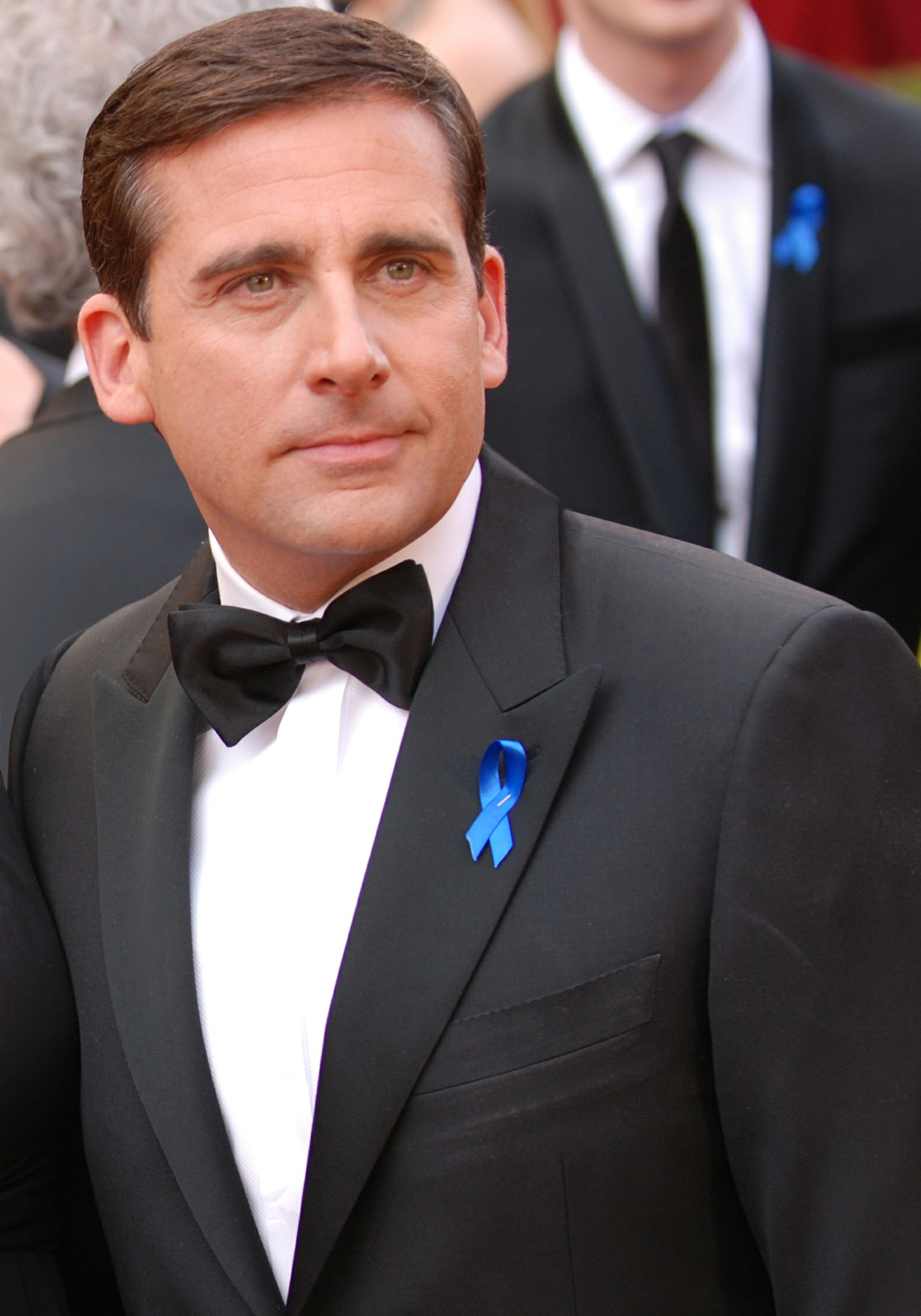
Steve Carell portrayed Eisman in The Big Short, released 2015.

Eisman rose to fame betting against collateralized debt obligations at Greenwich, Connecticut-based FrontPoint Partners LLC, a subsidiary of Morgan Stanley. By 2010, he managed more than $1 billion for FrontPoint. Eisman left FrontPoint Partners in 2011 amid investor withdrawals following an investigation of illegal insider trading by healthcare portfolio manager Chip Skowron (who ran funds separate from Eisman).

Eisman gained prominence after being profiled by Michael Lewis in his 2010 book The Big Short: Inside the Doomsday Machine. In the 2015 movie adaptation of Lewis' book, The Big Short, Eisman's name was changed to "Mark Baum", and he was portrayed by actor Steve Carell.

=== Emrys Partners ===
In March 2012, Eisman founded Emrys Partners with $23 million in seed capital. The fund performed poorly in 2012, returning 3.6% and underperforming the market. It did better in 2013, returning 10.8% but still underperforming the market. In July 2014, he announced that he was shutting down the fund, explaining his decision by stating that "making investment decisions by looking solely at the fundamentals of individual companies is no longer a viable investment philosophy." The fund controlled an estimated $185 million in assets at the time of its dissolution. Emrys Partners stopped operating in mid-2014.

=== Neuberger Berman ===
In September 2014, Eisman joined Neuberger Berman as a managing director and a portfolio manager for the Eisman Group within Neuberger Berman’s Private Asset Management division. The group, run by partners including Steve's parents, Elliott and Lillian Eisman, manages portfolios of stocks for wealthy clients.

Eisman was put on indefinite leave from Neuberger Berman in September 2024 after a controversial tweet in which he celebrated the destruction of Gaza.

=== Podcast ===
In 2025 Eisman started a weekly podcast, "The Real Eisman Playbook," available on YouTube and various audio streaming platforms.

== Views and controversies ==
=== Campaign against for-profit colleges ===
During a presentation at the 2010 Ira Sohn Conference Investment Research Conference, Eisman raised concerns about the for-profit education industry. In his presentation, Eisman was highly critical of companies that run for-profit colleges, such as Apollo Education Group, Corinthian Colleges, Education Management Corporation, and ITT Educational Services, likening their loaning practices to what he witnessed from the subprime mortgage industry in the midst of the housing bubble:

Until recently, I thought that there would never again be an opportunity to be involved with an industry as socially destructive and morally bankrupt as the subprime mortgage industry. I was wrong. The for-profit education industry has proven equal to the task.

After the United States Department of Education took action to strengthen a variety of consumer protection regulations in 2009-10, the for-profit industry retaliated by accusing Eisman of attempting to illegally influence the government and calling for an investigation. The allegations stem from a meeting that Eisman had with Department of Education officials David Bergeron and Robert Shireman, two weeks before delivering his speech at the Ira Sohn Conference. Shireman was in charge of the department's regulatory efforts, which had begun more than a year earlier. The agency’s Inspector General, after a review, concluded there was “no improper disclosure of sensitive information by Department officials in their communications with outside parties.”

After offering testimony to Senate Health, Education and Labor Committee on problems with for-profit higher education, Eisman was criticized by progressive groups such as Citizens for Responsibility and Ethics in Washington (CREW) on the grounds that he stood to profit from proposed regulations due to his short positions against private colleges. CREW was later found to have been receiving payments from a founder of the for-profit University of Phoenix. Harris Miller, president of the lobbying group that represents for-profit colleges said of him, "Eisman is a self-serving nutcase who got lucky. He's in the business of ruining the reputation of companies so he can make money when their stock prices drop."

By the end of 2018, after government and media investigations had exposed predatory practices including a fraudulent inducement to enroll, both Corinthian and ITT Educational Services were defunct, having ceased operations, due to reduced enrollment and ineligibility to continue participating in government backed student loan programs. The United States Department of Education later forgave over a half-million student loans linked to Corinthian programs.

=== 2023 Gaza War ===
In late 2023, during the Gaza war, Eisman requested that his family name be removed from a scholarship at his alma mater, the University of Pennsylvania, in response to what he described as antisemitic sentiments expressed during pro-Palestinian protests. Speaking to CNBC, he said that any student who “holds up a sign that says ‘free Palestine from the river to the sea’ should be expelled.”

On 20 September 2024, Eisman responded to a video on X showing burning tents of displaced Gazans after an Israeli airstrike, which was captioned "Screams of Palestinians being burnt alive. A holocaust is happening before our eyes and the world is silent." Eisman posted, "You must be kidding. We are not silent. We are celebrating." He subsequently apologized for his remarks and deleted his X account, but was placed on indefinite leave of absence from Neuberger Berman.

== Personal life ==
He has been married to Valerie Feigen since 1989. Valerie was portrayed in The Big Short under the name Cynthia, by Marisa Tomei. Feigen, who worked for J.P. Morgan, said of her husband, "Even on Wall Street, people think he's rude and obnoxious and aggressive." While Eisman seems aware of his tendency to be rude he does not seem to be concerned by it. He once said to an interviewer on this topic, "I forget myself sometimes."

Eisman's first-born son, Max, died after his night nurse rolled on top of him in her sleep. Eisman and people who know him well describe the death of his son as a hugely influential event that affected him in many ways.
