= Paul W. Grimm =

American judge (born 1951)

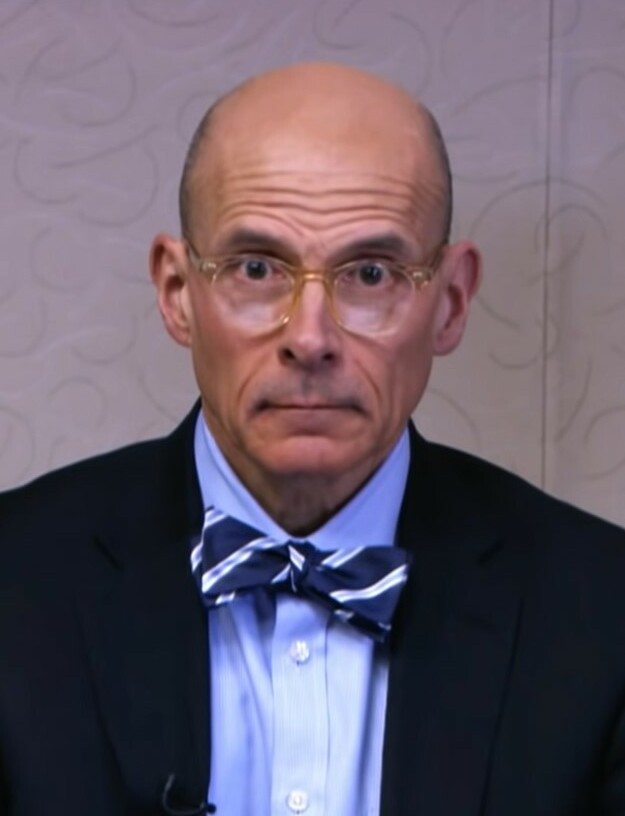
- Grimm in 2018

Senior Judge of the United States District Court for the District of Maryland
- In office December 11, 2022 – December 30, 2022

Judge of the United States District Court for the District of Maryland
- In office December 6, 2012 – December 11, 2022
- Appointed by: Barack Obama
- Preceded by: Benson Everett Legg
- Succeeded by: Matthew J. Maddox

Chief Magistrate Judge of the United States District Court for the District of Maryland
- In office 2006 – December 6, 2012

Magistrate Judge of the United States District Court for the District of Maryland
- In office 1997 – December 6, 2012

Personal details
- Born: December 26, 1951 (age 74) Yokohama, Japan
- Education: University of California, Davis (BA); University of New Mexico (JD); Duke University (LLM)

Military service
- Allegiance: United States
- Branch/service: United States Army
- Years of service: 1973–2001
- Rank: Lieutenant Colonel
- Unit: Judge Advocate General's Corps
- Awards: Meritorious Service Medal; Army Commendation Medal; Army Achievement Medal

Paul William Grimm (born December 26, 1951) is a former United States district judge of the United States District Court for the District of Maryland.

== Education ==
Judge Grimm attended the University of California, Davis, where he received a Bachelor of Arts degree in Classical Rhetoric in 1973, summa cum laude. While at Davis, Judge Grimm was a member of Phi Beta Kappa and the Reserve Officer Training Corps. In 1976, he received his Juris Doctor, magna cum laude, from the University of New Mexico School of Law.

Grimm received his Master of Laws from Duke University School of Law.

== Career ==
Born in Yokohama, Japan, Grimm has had both a military and civilian career in the law. Commissioned as a second lieutenant in the U.S. Army in 1973, he was released from service in 1979 as a captain and continued his service as a lieutenant colonel in the U.S. Army Reserve until 2001. In active service, his legal duties included the Judge Advocate General's Corps in Fort Bliss, Texas. In 1980, as a civilian, he joined the State's Attorney's Office for Baltimore County, Maryland and shortly thereafter became an Assistant Attorney General for the State of Maryland. From 1984 until 1997, Judge Grimm worked in private practice handling commercial litigation until his appointment as United States magistrate judge. Judge Grimm has written numerous books and articles on subjects including electronic discovery, civil procedure, evidence and trial practice and lectures frequently on these topics. He also teaches courses on these subjects at the University of Maryland School of Law and the University of Baltimore School of Law.

== Federal judicial service ==
On February 16, 2012, President Barack Obama nominated Grimm to serve as a United States District Judge of the United States District Court for the District of Maryland. He would replace Judge Benson Everett Legg who has announced that he is taking senior status effective June 8, 2012. The Senate Judiciary Committee held a hearing on his nomination on May 9, 2012, and reported his nomination to the floor on June 7, 2012. The Senate confirmed his nomination on December 3, 2012, by a 92–1 vote, with Senator Roy Blunt casting the sole no vote. He received his commission on December 6, 2012. He assumed senior status on December 11, 2022. Grimm retired from active service on December 30, 2022.

== Awards ==
During law school, Grimm was awarded the Order of Coif and served on the Law Review. Grimm has also received several military awards, including the Parachutist Badge, Meritorious Service Medal, Army Commendation Medal and Army Achievement Medal. His other awards include:

- Distinguished Service Award, Maryland Institute for Continuing Professional Education of Lawyers (1998)
- Professional Legal Excellence Award for the Advancement of Professional Competence Maryland Bar Foundation (2001)
- Outstanding Adjunct Faculty Member of the Year, University of Maryland School of Law (2002 and 2006)
- Maryland Leadership in Law Award, Daily Record (2004)

== Notable cases ==
Grimm's rulings on cases in which electronic discovery concerns were involved have advanced understanding of issues related to electronically stored information (ESI) in civil matters.

- Hopson v. Mayor and City Council of Baltimore (2005). In this widely cited 2005 opinion, Judge Grimm outlined a stop-gap formula that offered parties protection against the voluntary waiver of attorney–client privilege or attorney work product protections due to inadvertent production of ESI in the discovery process. In so doing, however, he highlighted the unmet need for a definitive legal rule that could provide more certain, uniform guidance on the waiver of those protections. Grimm's opinion in Hopson played a direct role in the subsequent enactment in 2008 of the new Federal Rule of Evidence (FRE) 502, which was designed to bring more certainty and uniformity to the law of voluntary waivers of the attorney–client privilege or work product protections in both federal and state courts. (When outlining the purposes of the new rule in the notes to FRE 502, the Judicial Conference Advisory Committee on Evidence Rules explicitly cited the Hopson opinion and Judge Grimm's concerns.)
- Lorraine v. Markel (2007). In a case regarding insurance coverage for a damaged boat, Judge Grimm wrote a 52-page opinion in which he articulated the evidentiary issues to be addressed in proving whether electronic data should be admitted into evidence at trial. A July 2008 article in the ABA Journal characterized Grimm as a "star" for breaking ground in a previously unaddressed aspect of evidentiary law.
- In Victor Stanley, Inc. v. Creative Pipe Inc. (2008), Judge Grimm found counsel had waived the attorney–client privilege as to a group of inadvertently produced documents because, inter alia, counsel failed to satisfactorily explain their review processes. He advised that counsel should be able to provide information regarding the search method used, reasons for its selection, the qualifications of the people who designed the search, the steps taken to assess reliability and appropriateness of the search method and the quality of its implementation. In his comments, Judge Grimm discussed indicia that a reasonable search had been performed, noting that the TREC Legal Track project (a subgroup of the Text Retrieval Conference) would be a way to "…support an argument that the party employing them performed a reasonable ESI search…".
- In Mancia v. Mayflower Textile Services Co. (2008), a wage dispute, Grimm wrote a 30-page opinion which contains a detailed examination of Federal Rule of Civil Procedure 26(g) (certification by counsel of discovery disclosures, requests, responses or objections, formed after reasonable inquiry) and an overview of the federal rules and other law that mandate cooperation among parties in discovery, dovetailing the views presented in the Sedona Conference Cooperation Proclamation.

Legal offices
Preceded by Benson Everett Legg	Judge of the United States District Court for the District of Maryland; 2012–2022	Succeeded by Matthew J. Maddox
