= Einstein v. 357 LLC =

Einstein v 357 LLC
- Court: Supreme Court of the State of New York, County of New York: Commercial Division
- Full case name: Einstein and Boyd v 357 LLC and the Corcoran Group, et al.
- Decided: November 12, 2009
- Citations: Supreme Court, NY County, 10/21/2009

Court membership
- Judges sitting: Charles E. Ramos, J.S.C.

Einstein v 357 LLC is a United States New York Supreme Court landmark decision which addresses a party's discovery obligations and the safeguarding of evidence. In particular, this decision addresses the issue of the intentional destruction of digital evidence when litigation has commenced or is reasonably anticipated. In short, this decision eradicates the excuse of ignorance in terms of how electronically stored information is saved, deleted, and retrieved.

== Background ==
The plaintiffs in this lawsuit, Harold Einstein and Jennifer Boyd brought an action against the defendants, 357 LLC and The Corcoran Group (a real estate business established by Barbara Corcoran), Adam Pacelli ("Pacelli"), Christina Coats ("Coats"), Anne Marie Gatz ("Gatz"), Daniel Alter Architect, PPL, Daniel Alter, Kutnicki-Bernsetein Architects, PLLC, Daniel Berstein, Andrew Katz, Peter Miceli, and Peter Miceli Plumbing. The action is based on claims against the Defendants for fraudulent inducement, fraudulent concealment, negligent misrepresentation, and violations of New York's Consumer Protection Act, which arose from correspondence and statements, which included emails, sent by brokers and forwarded to the Plaintiffs by the Defendants.

The claims were in connection with the alleged defective design construction, development and deceptive marketing of a condominium unit in Brooklyn ("Condominium"). The Plaintiffs are the buyers of the $1.3 million three-bedroom Park Slope Condominium which floods when it rains.

=== Missing emails ===
Discovery of emails

A number of applications and hearings took place following complaints by the Plaintiffs that the Corcoran Defendants had failed to comply with discovery obligations. The Plaintiffs took the view that the Corcoran Defendants' failure to disclose relevant emails, or attachments associated with emails which were disclosed, is evidence of "selective editing of discovery responses and/or spoliation of evidence". In particular, motion was made by the Plaintiffs on October 15, 2008 to strike the pleadings of the Corcoran Group, Pacelli, Coats and Gatz ("Corcoran Defendants") or, alternatively, to compel the Corcoran Defendants to comply with its discovery obligations. The alternative request sought to compel the Defendants to produce, amongst other things, an image of the Corcoran Defendants' computer hard drives and emails for forensic data recovery.

The Plaintiffs eventually obtained an order directing each of the Corcoran Defendants to produce their respective hard drives to an independent vendor for inspection and deleted file recovery and for a keyword search of terms be conducted for extraction and production. The Corcoran Defendants eventually produced two hard drives ("Hard Drives") which they say are an exact replica of the central server in connection with the persons in question as all Corcoran e-mails are forwarded to a central server.

Forensic examination of hard drives

A third-party computer forensics expert ("Expert") subsequently performed a forensic search and analysis of the data on the Hard Drives and found, among other things, that the Hard Drives contain no current .pst or .ost files for Pacelli or Coats. Files for Gatz disclosed a large number of emails, but none were relevant. Further, it was determined by the Expert that certain relevant emails identified by the Plaintiffs to be searched for were not found on the Hard Drives and that there was no proof of deletion found.

=== Findings on Evidence ===
The Corcoran Group initially attempted to insist that no emails relating to the subject matter of the litigation was omitted by an explanation that all emails provided were either from a central server which contained all relevant emails or from Hard Drives which were exact duplicates of the hard drives of the office computers used by the relevant agents of Corcoran Group who worked on the sale in relation to the Condominium.

However, by the Corcoran Defendants' subsequent evidence and testimony of Terence Thomas ("Thomas"), a director of Information Technology at the Corcoran Group, numerous incidents of material non-disclosure and numerous failures in relation to the Corcoran Defendants discharging their discovery obligations was found by the Court. The evidence showed that Thomas had failed to disclose an email deletion policy of the Corcoran Group ("Deletion Policy") until after numerous orders of the Court and late in the proceedings. The Deletion Policy required emails to be regularly deleted by users to make room for more emails as a result of the fact that email mailboxes of Corcoran's brokers are allocated a limited amount of megabytes. It is a part of the Deletion Policy that users must manually delete emails at their discretion, but whatever records users have are to be retained so that they may be presented.

After considering the evidence, the Court found that (1) the Corcoran Group failed to implement any change in its email Deletion Policy upon commencement of litigation; (2) the Corcoran Defendants continued to delete emails in accordance with their ordinary practices even after the commencement of litigation because nobody, including Counsel for the Corcoran Defendants implemented any change to the Deletion Policy; (3) the Corcoran Defendants failed to submit evidence of correspondence among each other despite clear evidence that there should be; (4) the emails produced by the Corcoran Defendants were selective in nature; and (5) Counsel for the Corcoran Defendants made numerous materially false statements to the Plaintiffs and the Court, including statements which indicate that the Corcoran Defendants have, in good faith, complied with discovery obligations.

== Ruling ==
The Court reasoned that while deletion of emails in the ordinary course of business in not improper, parties must take additional steps to preserve potentially relevant emails once litigation has commenced or is reasonably anticipated. From the evidence which was adduced before the Court, it took the view that the Corcoran Defendants had failed to implement a litigation hold and that they should be sanctioned for such failure.

The Court took the view that the Corcoran Defendants' "failure to suspend the deletion policy or even investigate the basic ways in which emails were stored and deleted constitutes a serious discovery default on the part of the Corcoran Defendants and their counsel rising to the level of gross negligence or willfulness".

The Court drew the adverse inference that the emails deleted were unfavourable to the Corcoran Defendants and that at least some of the deleted emails were relevant to the litigation and favourable to the Plaintiffs. Having found that the Plaintiffs have established that the Corcoran Defendants should be sanctioned for their failure to implement a litigation hold. The Court also awarded attorneys' fees and costs in favour of the Plaintiffs.
