= Eric Vanderburg =

American cyber security professional

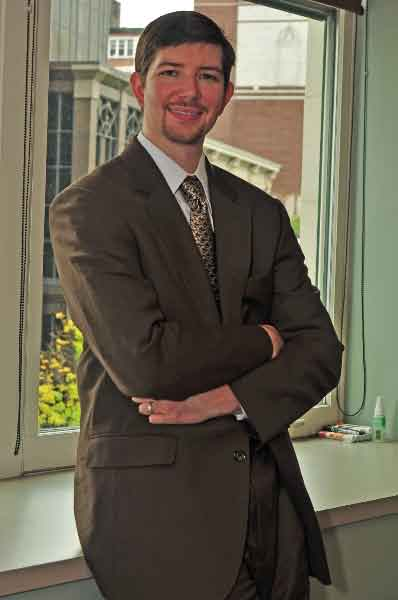
- Vanderburg at Jurinnov headquarters in Cleveland, 2011
- Born: Parma, Ohio, U.S.
- Citizenship: American
- Education: University of Fairfax; Kent State University
- Occupations: Author, Business Leader; TCDI
- Known for: storage networking, security

Eric Vanderburg is an American cyber security, storage networking and information technology professional and writer living in Cleveland, Ohio.

Vanderburg is Vice President of Cybersecurity at TCDI and an author and speaker on information security. He has been interviewed on TV and radio to discuss information security and he presents and conferences and seminars and has participated in panels on information security.

== Education ==
Vanderburg attended Kent State University earning both a bachelor of Science in Technology and a Masters in Business Administration. He also has a Master of Business Administration (MBA), and pursued a doctorate in information assurance.

== Life and career ==
Vanderburg has been interested in technology from an early age, often reading through computer manuals in his library, thus allowing himself to learn "some basics of programming". After spending some time with hackers and "Internet deviants" in the early 1990s, he managed to turn his interest in IT security into a career, and since the late 1990s his interest has primarily been that of cybersecurity within the business world. He has also spoken about the development of DevOps in the business world.

Vanderburg founded Independent Systems Consulting, an IT consulting firm, in 1997, which he ran for almost ten years. He then joined Jurinnov in 2006 where he directed IT, digital forensics, and cybersecurity consulting teams. In 2009, he built a network operations center at Jurinnov's headquarters to monitor data center operations and to perform transaction monitoring of key business and client systems. In 2016, Vanderburg became Vice President of Cybersecurity at TCDI when TCDI acquired Jurinnov. He is also a TechMin Network board member.

Vanderburg was involved with Hitachi Data Systems in testing their Essential NAS product which he compared to the Netapp FAS3000 NAS and he partnered with Lateral Data in using their Viewpoint eDiscovery tool to perform large-scale litigation document review. He worked with Venio on their litigation review tool with early case assessment (ECA), and has worked with companies including Dell, Carbonite, BitDefender, Microsoft and AT&T.

Vanderburg has served as an expert witness in cases involving digital preservation, electronic communication, access control and confidential information disclosure, database management systems, and directory services.

== Academic contributions ==
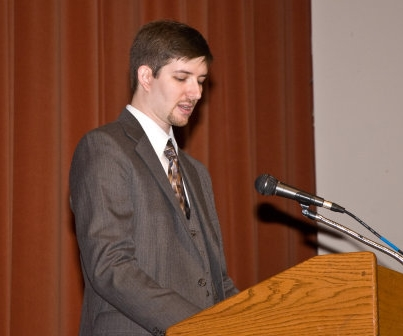
Eric Vanderburg delivering the commencement address to the graduating class of 2010 at Vatterott College

Vanderburg taught courses in security, database management systems, and computer networking at Remington College's Cleveland-West campus as an instructor and chair of the Computer Networking Technology program. He served as an adjunct instructor in the Computer Information Systems department at Lorain County Community College in Elyria, Ohio. Vanderburg has delivered commencement speeches at the Vatterott College Cleveland campus 2010 commencement and Remington College Cleveland-West campus's final graduation in 2013. He has also taught web-based courses for professional development for eForensics Magazine. Vanderburg has served on the advisory boards for Remington College, Vatterott College, Lincoln School of Technology and Cuyahoga Community College Workforce and Economic Development Division (WEDD).

== Publications and bibliography ==
Vanderburg has published in CIO Magazine, eForensics Magazine, Network World, Computer World, Networks Asia Certification Magazine, PC Security World, CSO Magazine, ARN, TechWorld, and McGladrey Technology News Brief Vanderburg also maintains a blog called Security Thinking Cap.

=== Bibliography ===
- Vanderburg, Eric A. (13 June 2015). CompTIA Storage+ Quick Review Guide (eBook) (1 ed.). ISBN 9780071800372.
- Vanderburg, Eric A. (8 March 2017). SCSP SNIA Certified Storage Professional All-in-One Exam Guide (Exam S10-110) (Print) (1 ed.). ISBN 9781260011074.

== See also ==
- CompTIA Storage+
