= SPVAT =

Mandatory insurance in Brazil

Seguro Obrigatório para Proteção de Vítimas de Acidentes de Trânsito (SPVAT) (in Portuguese), or Compulsory Insurance for the Protection of Victims of Traffic Accidents), is a mandatory insurance in Brazil that provides compensation to victims of accidents caused by land motor vehicles. It was established in 1974 by Law 6,194/74. It does not apply to trains, boats, aircraft or bicycles, and it does not cover material damages (such as damage to vehicles). However, it does apply to accidents involving land-based automotive vehicles, bicycles and pedestrians.

It ensures financial compensation for accident victims for death (at R$13,500), permanent disability (up to R$13,500), and medical assistance and supplementary expenses (up to R$2,700) – the amounts are set by the National Private Insurance Council – CNSP (which has links with the Ministry of the Treasury), and ratified by Law 11,482/07.

It is compulsory for all motor vehicle owners. It is paid for annually at the start of each year, and it is valid between 1 January and 31 December. Different types of vehicles pay different fees. For cars, the fee was R$101.10 in 2016, R$63.69 in 2017, and R$42 in 2018. For motorbikes it is R$180.65 in 2018 due to higher accident rates. Different fees apply for rental cars, taxis, mopeds, trucks and buses.
