= Intervenor compensation =

Practice in American regulatory procedures

Intervenor compensation is a practice in which community representatives and public advocates are compensated by the state for their involvement in regulatory procedures of public interest. Intervenor compensation programs have been suggested or enacted in several American states, examples of enactment include California, Hawaii, Maine, Virginia and Wisconsin.
