= Shira Scheindlin =

American judge

Shira A. Scheindlin
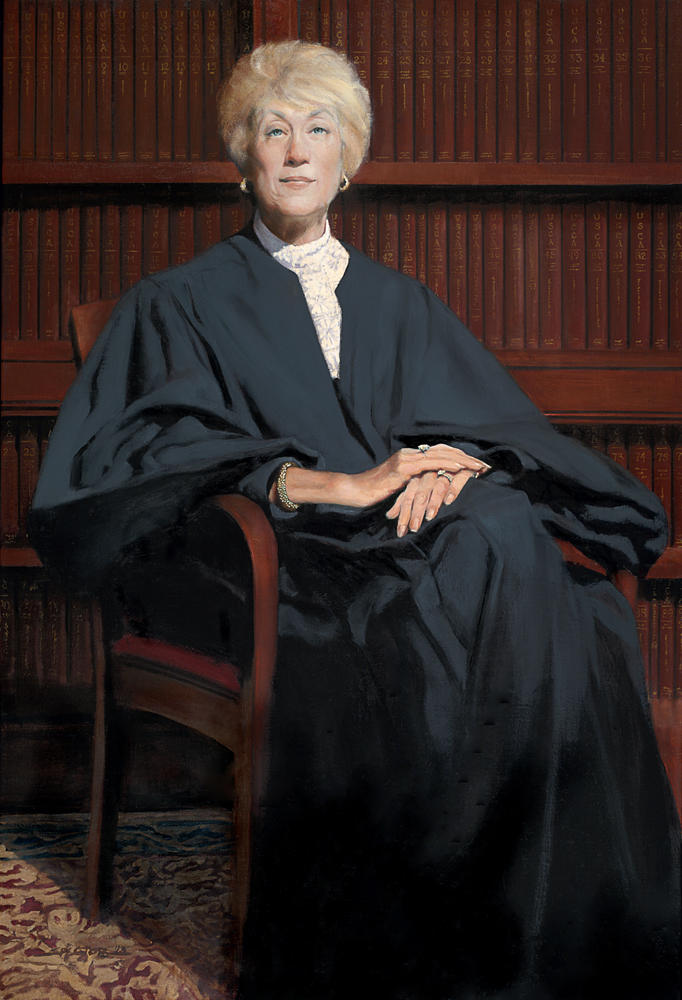

Senior Judge of the United States District Court for the Southern District of New York
- In office August 16, 2011 – April 29, 2016

Judge of the United States District Court for the Southern District of New York
- In office September 29, 1994 – August 16, 2011
- Appointed by: Bill Clinton
- Preceded by: Louis Freeh
- Succeeded by: Lorna G. Schofield

Magistrate Judge of the United States District Court for the Eastern District of New York
- In office 1982–1986

Personal details
- Born: Shira Ann Joffe; August 16, 1946 (age 80) Washington, D.C., U.S.
- Education: University of Michigan (BA); Columbia University (MA); Cornell University (JD)

Shira Ann Scheindlin (/ˈʃɛndlɪn/; née Joffe; born August 16, 1946) is an American attorney and jurist who served as a United States district judge of the United States District Court for the Southern District of New York. She is currently of counsel at Boies Schiller Flexner LLP.

== Early life and education ==
Scheindlin was born in Washington, D.C. She earned a Bachelor of Arts degree in Far Eastern studies from the University of Michigan (1967), a Master of Arts in history from Columbia University (1969), and a Juris Doctor from Cornell Law School (1975).

== Career ==
Before taking her seat on the Southern District, Scheindlin worked as a prosecutor, commercial lawyer, and judge. She was a clerk for federal district court judge Charles L. Brieant from 1976 to 1977 and from 1977 to 1981 was an assistant United States attorney for the Eastern District of New York. From 1981 to 1982, she was general counsel for the New York City Department of Investigation. Starting in 1982 and continuing through 1984, she served as special master in the Agent Orange mass tort litigation. She was an adjunct professor at Brooklyn Law School from 1983 to 1994. From 1992 to 1994, she was special master for another mass tort case involving property damaged by asbestos.

As a commercial lawyer, Scheindlin worked for Stroock & Stroock & Lavan (1975–76), Budd, Larner, Gross, Rosenbaum, Greenberg & Sade (1986–90), and Herzfeld & Rubin, P.C. (1990–94).

=== Federal judicial service ===
Scheindlin was nominated by President Bill Clinton on July 28, 1994, to a seat vacated by Louis Freeh (who went on to be director of the FBI). The United States Senate confirmed her on September 28, 1994, and she was commissioned on September 29, 1994. On December 12, 2012, Scheindlin's judicial seat was filled by Lorna G. Schofield after Scheindlin assumed senior status. On March 23, 2016, she announced her intention to retire. She retired from the bench on April 29, 2016.

Scheindlin's greatest influence has been in the field of electronic discovery. Scheindlin's decisions in Zubulake v. UBS Warburg were "so influential [the rulings were] partially absorbed into the recent civil procedure amendments [in 2006]."

=== Later career ===
On May 2, 2016, Scheindlin returned to Stroock & Stroock & Lavan LLP, joining the Litigation Practice Group there as counsel to the firm. She also offerered her services as an arbitrator and mediator. In September 2023, Scheindlin joined Boies Schiller Flexner LLP as counsel, saying that the firm's disputes-only offering minimized the potential of client conflicts, which are common at larger firms.

== Notable rulings ==
During her tenure, Scheindlin presided over a number of high-profile cases, many of which advanced important new positions in interpretations of the United States Constitution or federal law.

- In December 1997, New York magazine ran advertisements on 75 New York City buses along with a picture of Mayor Rudy Giuliani that said: "Possibly the only good thing in New York Rudy hasn't taken credit for." Mayor Giuliani had a deputy call the Metropolitan Transportation Authority (MTA) to complain that he had not given the magazine permission to use his name in its ad, and the ads were removed. The magazine sued the City, alleging that it was violating the magazine's First Amendment rights. The City's lawyers contended that the advertisements "irreparably harm[ed]' Mayor Giuliani's right to control how his name is used in advertising." Judge Scheindlin held that the ads were "clearly a hybrid of commercial speech and political satire." "Salting her opinion with mild sarcasm amid a methodical analysis of the constitutional protections afforded to commercial speech, the judge ordered the Metropolitan Transportation Authority to restore the advertisements immediately to the buses."
- In April 2002, in the case United States v. Osama Awadallah, after Awadallah testified before a grand jury that he had met with two of the hijackers behind the September 11 attacks, but could not remember their names, Scheindlin dismissed a perjury charge against him and found that Awadallah's prolonged detention without actual criminal charges was based on misrepresentations and omissions by the government and could not be justified under existing law. Her decision was reversed on appeal.
- In February 2004, in the case Maurice Clarett v. National Football League, Scheindlin, accepting the antitrust-law arguments raised by counsel, ruled that the NFL could not bar Clarett from participating in the 2004 NFL draft. This decision was overturned by the United States Court of Appeals for the Second Circuit, and the case was not heard by the Supreme Court.
- In April 2004, in the case Zubulake v. UBS Warburg, Scheindlin sanctioned UBS for not being able to complete their electronic discovery of potentially informative documents, and not complying with their litigation hold on the destruction of documents. This case has been seen as revolutionary in the legal realms of human resources and computer forensics, as the burden of proof was effectively shifted to the defendant for its inability to produce documents in a timely manner, and the presentation to the jury of an adverse inference.
- Judge Scheindlin presided over three trials of John Gotti Jr. ("Junior"), each of which ended in a mistrial due to a deadlocked jury. The principal charge against Gotti in the trials was racketeering conspiracy stemming from Gotti's alleged management of the Gambino crime family following the incarceration and death of his father, John Gotti Sr. "On September 20, 2005, a jury acquitted him of securities fraud and hung 11-1 for conviction on racketeering charges that included an assault on Curtis Sliwa. His re-trial on the remaining charges the following March also ended in a mistrial, with the jury hung 8-4 for acquittal. At the third trial involving the Sliwa assault, prosecutors convinced 12 jurors that Junior had ordered the kidnapping but failed to convince them that he had engaged in criminal activity after 1999 and the jury again deadlocked on the racketeering charges, this time voting 8-4 for conviction."
- In September 2006, Scheindlin ruled that Judith Clark, a Weather Underground radical serving 75 years to life for the murder of a Brinks guard and two police officers during a robbery, was entitled to a new trial because her Sixth Amendment right to counsel was violated. Scheindlin found Clark's right to counsel was violated even though the then-self-proclaimed revolutionary insisted on representing herself at trial, turned down legal counsel, boycotted much of the trial, and refused to recognize the court's authority. In January 2008, the Second Circuit Court of Appeals unanimously reversed Scheindlin's ruling and held that Clark was not denied her right to counsel because Clark "knowingly and intelligently exercised her constitutional right to make those choices."
- In January 2009, Judge Scheindlin ruled in SEC v Collins & Aikman, a case which addressed discovery obligations of the Government in civil litigation. The case opines that the government was obliged to search its own electronic data to produce responsive documents (versus providing a 10-million page data dump), submit materials allegedly covered by the deliberative process privilege to the Court for in camera review, and search its e-mail and attachments after cooperating with the plaintiff in the negotiation of an appropriate search protocol "designed to retrieve responsive information without incurring an unduly burdensome expense disproportionate to the size and needs of the case." Notably, Judge Scheindlin held in this case that the burden rested with the U.S. Securities and Exchange Commission (SEC) to provide to the defendant the compilation of documents that supported the allegations in the Complaint, rather than passing the burden to the defendant to come up with "appropriate" search terms, especially since "the inaccuracy of such searches is by now relatively well known." (In Footnote 39, she referenced TREC Legal Track and other studies that research and report on different search methodologies.) She concluded in this case that a government agency is subject to the "same discovery rules that govern private parties (albeit with the benefit of additional privileges such as deliberative process and state secrets)", thus ordering the SEC to produce documents as requested by the plaintiff.
- On September 2, 2009, Judge Scheindlin ruled on whether credit rating agencies are protected by the First Amendment where the rating agencies have disseminated their ratings to a select group of investors rather than to the general public. "Judge Shira Scheindlin denied the rating agencies' motions to dismiss. Most significantly, Judge Scheindlin rejected the rating agencies' argument that their rating opinions were entitled to immunity under the First Amendment, and she also rejected their argument that their rating represented non-actionable opinion."
- In 2011, Judge Scheindlin presided over the trial and conviction of arms trafficker Viktor Bout.
- In August 2013, Judge Scheindlin ruled that the New York City stop-and-frisk program was being applied in an unconstitutional manner, ordered immediate changes to the program, and called for a monitor to supervise related reforms. The case was Floyd v. City of New York. In October 2013, the Second Circuit stayed Scheindlin's decision, and removed her from the case for violating the Code of Conduct for United States Judges. On November 13, 2013, in response to a Motion filed by Judge Scheindlin seeking reconsideration of her removal from the case on remand, the motion panel of the Second Circuit that issued the Order of removal declined to permit Scheindlin to dispute her removal, but issued an opinion purporting to disavow its previous conclusion that she had "run afoul" of the Code of Conduct. Rather, the panel stated, "[w]e conclude only that, based on her conduct at the December 21, 2007 hearing and in giving the interviews to the news media in May 2013, Judge Scheindlin's appearance of impartiality may reasonably be questioned... and that 'reassignment is advisable to preserve the appearance of justice.'"
- In December 2013, in Morgan Stanley v. Skowron, 989 F. Supp. 2d 356 (S.D.N.Y. 2013), applying New York's faithless servant doctrine, she held that a hedge fund's employee engaging in insider trading in violation of his company's code of conduct, which also required him to report his misconduct, must repay his employer the full $31 million his employer paid him as compensation during his period of faithlessness. Judge Scheindlin called the insider trading the "ultimate abuse of a portfolio manager's position." The judge also wrote: "In addition to exposing Morgan Stanley to government investigations and direct financial losses, Skowron's behavior damaged the firm's reputation, a valuable corporate asset."
- In March 2014, she presided over and dismissed charges against Devyani Khobragade, a consulate employee arrested in December 2013 and charged with lying to investigators on the visa application for her domestic employee, finding that India's action in making her a full diplomat after the crime but before indictment gave her diplomatic immunity. Her arrest had sparked tensions between the U.S. and India.
- In perhaps her most significant case involving civil rights, after her Stop and Frisk decision, Judge Scheindlin certified a stipulated agreement between Governor Andrew Cuomo and the class action litigants Leroy Peoples. et al. Peoples v. Fischer S.D.N.Y., Index No. 11 CIV 2964 SAS (now titled Peoples v. Annucci because the case lead to DOCCS Superintendent Fischer's resignation - (Mr. Anthony Annucci is "acting" commissioner)). This 80 million dollar settlement involves the misuse of solitary confinement by the New York Prison system, the Special Housing Unit (SHU), aka the Box.

== Awards ==
- PEN Oakland/Adelle Foley Award given by PEN Oakland (2016)
- The Stanley H. Fuld Award for Outstanding Contributions to Commercial Law and Litigation, New York State Bar Association (2014)
- Distinguished Jurist Award from the National Association of Criminal Defense Lawyers (2008)
- William Nelson Cromwell Award for unselfish service to the profession and the community from the New York County Lawyers Association (2007)
- Edward Weinfeld Award for Distinguished Contributions to the Administration of Justice, New York County Lawyers (2005)
- William J. Brennan Award, Criminal Law Section, New York State Bar Association (2003)
- Robert L. Haig Award for distinguished public service, Commercial & Federal Litigation Section, New York State Bar Association (2001)
- Special Achievement Award in appreciation and recognition of Sustained Superior Performance of Duty, U.S. Department of Justice (1980)

== Selected works ==
- "Legal Services: Past and Present", 59 Cornell L. Rev. 960 (1974).
- (with Charles L. Briaent, Jr.). "Venue in the Second Circuit". 43 Brooklyn L. Rev. 841 (1977).
- "Discovering the Discoverable: A Bird's Eye View of Discovery in a Complex Multidistrict Class Action Litigation". 52 Brooklyn L. Rev. 397 (1986).
- (with Stacy Caplow). "A Portrait of a Lady: The Woman Lawyer in the 1980s". 35 N.Y.L. Sch. L. Rev. 391 (1990).
- "Guide to the Southern District of New York Civil Justice Expense and Delay Reduction Plan". 481 PLI/Lit 729 (1993).
- "Legal/Business Advice Dichotomy". N.Y.L.J., August 5, 1993.
- (with David Ross). "The ADR Landscape". 496 PLI/Lit 437 (1994).
- "A Year in the Life: Reflections of a New District Judge". N.Y.L.J., November 20, 1995.
- (with John Elofson). "Judges, Juries, and Sexual Harassment". 17 Yale L. & Pol'y Rev. 813 (1999) *"A Year in the Life: Reflections of a New District Judge", N.Y.L.J., Nov. 20, 1995.
- "Foreword, A Corporate Counsel's Guide to Discovery in the Information Age". Washington Legal Foundation (2000).
- "Secrecy and the Courts: The Judges' Perspective". 9 J.L. & Pol'y 169 (2000).
- (with Jeffrey Rabkin) "Electronic Discovery in Federal Civil Litigation: Is Rule 34 Up to the Task?". 41 B.C.L. Rev. 327 (2000).
- (with Jeffrey Rabkin). "Outside Counsel: Retaining, Destroying and Producing E-Data: Part 2". N.Y.L.J., May 9, 2002.
- "Judge Jack V. Weinstein, Tort Litigation, and the Public Good: A Roundtable Discussion to Honor One of America's Great Trial Judges on the Occasion of his 80th Birthday". 12 J.L. & Pol'y 149 (2003).
- (with Jonathan M. Redgrave). "Revisions in Federal Rule 53 Provide New Options for Using Special Masters in Litigation". 76 Journal of the N.Y. State Bar Association 18 (Jan 2004).
- (with Matthew L. Schwartz). "With All Due Deference: Judicial Responsibility in a Time of Crisis". 32 Hofstra L. Rev. 795 (Spring 2004).
- "Mastering Rule 53: The Evolution and Impact of the New Federal Rule Governing Special Masters", 51 Federal Lawyer 34 (Feb. 2004) (with Jonathan M. Redgrave, Esq.).
- (with Kanchana Wangkeo). "Electronic Discovery Sanctions in the Twenty-First Century". 11 Michigan Telecommunications and Technology Law Review 71 (Fall 2004).
- "E-Discovery: The Newly Amended Federal Rules of Civil Procedure". Moore's Federal Practice, 2006.
- (with Brian Lehman). "One Day in September (A Celebration of the Bill of Rights)". N.Y.L.J., September 25, 2006.
- "The Future of Litigation". N.Y.L.J., February 5, 2010.
- "Supreme Court to again address who decides the gateway issue of arbitrability". Westlaw Today, December 7, 2023.

== Family and personal life ==
Scheindlin was born in Washington, DC, and raised in Detroit, Michigan. She was the second of three children. Her mother, Miriam Shapiro, was a public school teacher. Her father, Boris M. Joffe, was the executive director of the Detroit Jewish Community Council. Joffe died in 1960, when Scheindlin was 13.

Scheindlin has two children. Dov Scheindlin is a violist, currently performing with the Orpheus Chamber Orchestra and the Metropolitan Opera Orchestra. Dahlia Scheindlin is an international public opinion analyst, consultant, and author.

Scheindlin is not related to the television personality Judith "Judge Judy" Sheindlin. She is also not related to Jerry Sheindlin, Judge Judy's spouse, who was an arbiter on the television show, The People's Court.

== See also ==
- List of Jewish American jurists

Legal offices
Preceded by Louis Freeh	Judge of the United States District Court for the Southern District of New York; 1994–2011	Succeeded by Lorna G. Schofield
