= Early case assessment =

Early case assessment refers to estimating risk (cost of time and money) to prosecute or defend a legal case. Global organizations deal with legal discovery and disclosure requests for electronically stored information "ESI" and paper documents on a regular basis.

Over 90% of all cases settle prior to trial. Often an organization will spend significant time and money on a case only to find they want to settle for whatever reason. Legal discovery costs are usually the most burdensome financially to both plaintiff and defendant. Often, and during cases in the United States, an opposing party will strategize on how to make it as difficult as possible for you to comply with the discovery process, including time and cost to respond to discovery requests. Because of this, organizations have a continued need to conduct early case assessment to determine their risks and benefits of taking a case to trial without painful settlement discussions.

Many service organizations, law firms, and corporations refer to early case assessment differently. Consultants hired by the corporation or law firm on a case manage cases on a risk basis. There also exist a number of software tools that assist in and help facilitate the process of early case assessment. Effective early case assessment might require the combination of professional expertise and software. This pairing, depending on the professional and tools used can provide various degrees of early case assessment review. Early case assessment, as a managed process, often requires customization to each case and the client involved.

The early case assessment lifecycle will typically include all of the following:

1. Perform a risk-benefit analysis.
2. Place and manage a legal hold on potentially responsive documents (paper and ESI) in appropriate countries.
3. Preserve information abroad.
4. Gather relevant information for attorney and expert document review.
5. Process potentially relevant information for purposes of filtering, search term, or data analytics.
6. Information hosting for attorney and expert document review, commenting, redaction.
7. Produce documents to parties in the case.
8. Reuse information in future cases.

Early case assessment software is typically used by attorneys, corporate legal departments, risk managers, forensics teams, IT professionals and independent consultants to help them analyze unstructured electronically stored information.

The software approach to early case assessment typically includes the following:

1. Determine the source files to analyze.
2. Point the analysis tool to the files to be analyzed.
3. Set parameters for the assessment.
4. Allow the program to automatically scan and assess the data, which may be located on local hard drives, removable media, file servers, whole networks, etc.)
5. Review reports generated by the software.

== See also ==
- Discovery (law)
- Electronic discovery
- Legal hold
