= Lorraine v. Markel American Insurance Co. =

- Court: United States District Court for the District of Maryland
- Full case name: Jack R. Lorraine and Beverly Mack v. Markel American Insurance Company
- Decided: May 4, 2007
- Docket nos.: 1:06-cv-01893
- Citation: 241 F.R.D. 534

Holding
- Neither party provided admissible evidence to support the facts set forth in their respective motions for summary judgment.

Court membership
- Judge sitting: Paul W. Grimm

Keywords
- Federal Rules of Civil Procedure; Federal Rules of Evidence

Lorraine v. Markel American Insurance Company, 241 F.R.D. 534 (D. Md. 2007), is a case in which a landmark decision about the admissibility and authentication of digital evidence was set down in the form of a 100-page opinion by Magistrate Judge Paul W. Grimm.

== Facts ==
Jack R. Lorraine and Beverly Mack had a yacht that was damaged by lightning. While Markel American Insurance Company already awarded costs for repair, more damage was found at a later stage when the yacht was removed from the water. In order to assess the additional damages, both parties entered into an arbitration agreement to assess if these damages were also due to the lightning strike. While both parties seek to confirm and enforce the arbitrator’s decision, this case comes forth from the ambiguous language used in the arbitration agreement regarding the authority of the arbitrator. Where Lorraine (plaintiff) argues that he is entitled to the sum of $36,000 as it was found that the damages came indeed from the lightning strike, Markel (defendant) argues that they acknowledge the damages to be reimbursed, but only to a limit of $14,000 as recommended by the arbitrator. Both parties moved for summary judgment, providing documentary evidence in the form of the arbitration agreement, award, and copies of e-mail correspondence between counsel.

== Decision ==
=== Ruling ===
Magistrate Judge Paul W. Grimm stated that although the language of the arbitration agreement is indeed ambiguous enough to proceed with a trial, neither party provided admissible evidence to support the facts set forth in their respective motions for summary judgment under rule 56 of the Federal Rules of Civil Procedure for the following reasons:

- None of the exhibits were authenticated.
- No attempt was made to resolve hearsay issues.
- The original writing rule was not complied with.
- The absence of unfair prejudice was not demonstrated.

Both motions were denied without prejudice.

=== Opinion ===
Because Magistrate Judge Paul W. Grimm found that guidance is needed for counsel to properly admit Electronically Stored Information (ESI) into evidence at trial or for use in summary judgment, he decided to provide broad analysis and guidance in his opinion. He summarized that whenever ESI is offered as evidence, either the judge or jury can make a preliminary determination regarding the admissibility of evidence under rule 104(a) or (b) respectively. If the jury decides, the Federal Rules of Evidence still apply; however when the judge makes the decision, they do not apply anymore. When no preliminary determination is made, five more distinct yet interrelated evidence rules must be considered:

  1. Rules 401, 402 and 105 - These rules are used to determine the relevance of the ESI, meaning that evidence is only admissible if it contains facts that are important to be included in a case, because if they were not included the ruling might be different. Furthermore, the fact that ESI is admissible for one purpose does not automatically mean that it is also admissible for another purpose.
    - In the case of Lorraine v. Markel, the evidence meets the requirements in these rules as it helps in determining the scope of the arbitration agreement.
    - See also United States v. Safavian on admissibility of e-mails
  2. Rule 901(a) - This rule points out that one has to be able to prove that the ESI present is indeed what one claims it to be. The methods that can be used for authenticating evidence are described in the rule. Specifically for ESI, creating hash values or analyzing meta-data are both generally accepted methods.
    - In the case of Lorraine v. Markel, neither plaintiffs nor defendants authenticated the exhibits attached to their motions, rendering them useless as evidence. This was also the first reason for denying the motions.
    - See also United States v. Tank on admissibility of chat room logs
  3. Rule 801 - Evidence is hearsay if it constitutes a statement offered for its substantive truth and is not excluded from the definition of hearsay, unless it is an exception under rules 803, 804 or 807.
    - See also United States v. Rollins on the admissibility of computer generated records.
  4. Rules 1001 - 1008 - This set of rules defines that the evidence provided should either be original or an admissible duplicate, and if that is not possible which secondary evidence could be admissible instead in order to prove the contents of the evidence. Examples hereof often used for ESI are summaries or photographs of the original evidence.
    - In the case of Lorraine v. Markel, neither counsel addressed these rules appropriately, even though it is quite obvious that they apply to the e-mail exhibits provided.
    - See also People v. Huehn on the admissibility of computer generated bank records for which the original is unavailable
  5. Rule 403 - This rule is the final rule that can still result in the exclusion of evidence. It stipulates that even though the presented evidence has probative value, it may still be deemed not admissible if its admission would create unfair prejudice, confuse or mislead the jury or delay the trial unnecessarily. With regards to ESI, examples of evidence that could be excluded under this rule are when the evidence contains excessive offensive language, or when computer animations are used to make a point which can be incorrectly interpreted by the jury.
    - In the case of Lorraine v. Markel, the applicability of rule 403 was not addressed by either party.
    - See also Friend v. Time Manufacturing Co. on the admissibility of computer animations

== Consequences ==
With this opinion, Magistrate Judge Paul W. Grimm has established a detailed baseline for the use of ESI before his court. Given the guidelines and references provided by the judge, it now becomes difficult for counsel to argue admissibility of electronic evidence. With this guide at hand, one can easily determine beforehand which evidence will and will not be allowed in trial, and provide a thorough framework of protection for both the plaintiff and the defendant.
