= Maura R. Grossman =

Research professor

Maura Robin Grossman
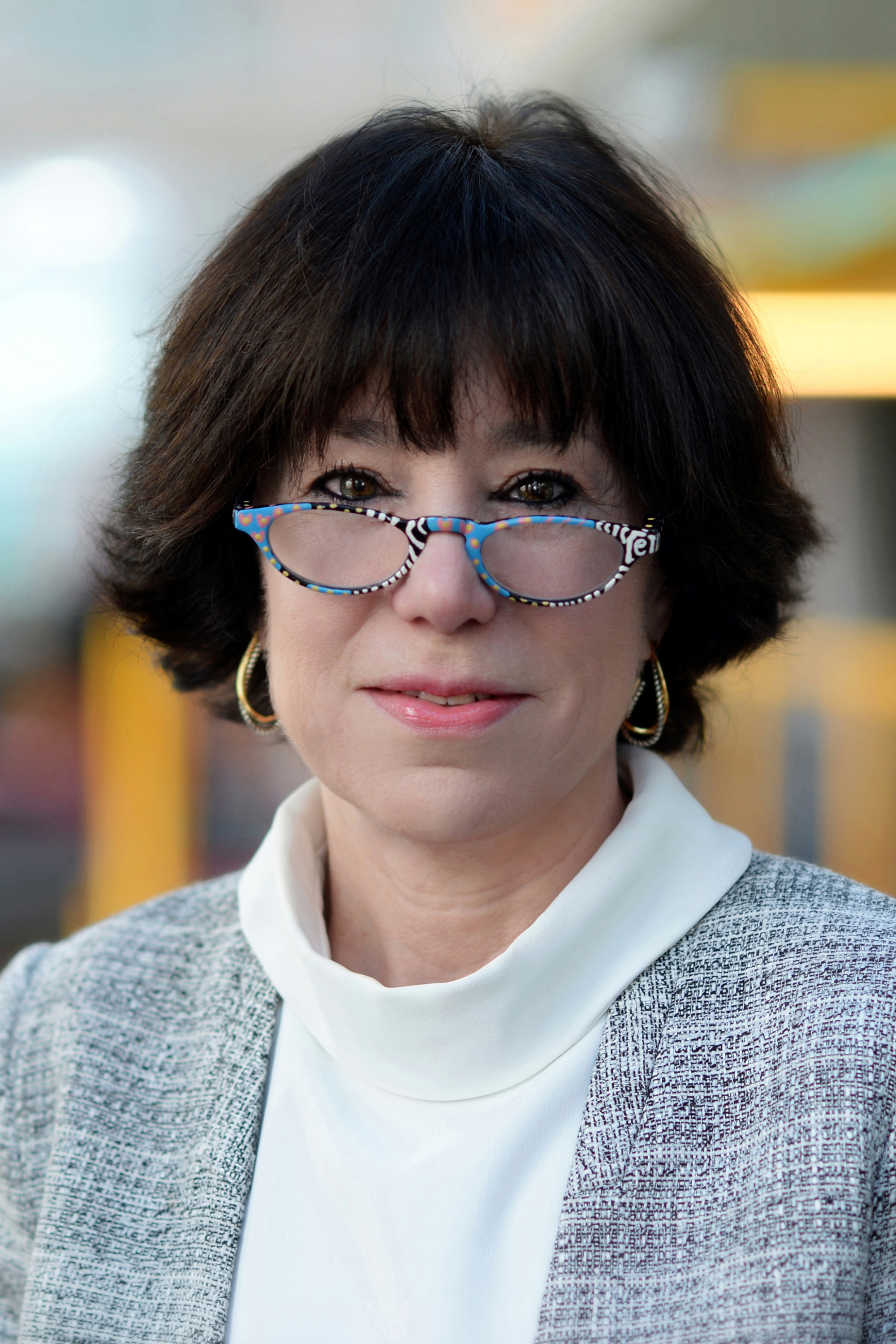
- Known for: Technology-assisted review (TAR) for electronic discovery
- Website: https://grossman.uwaterloo.ca/

Maura Robin Grossman is a research professor and former Director of Women in Computer Science in the David R. Cheriton School of Computer Science at the University of Waterloo. She is cross-appointed to the School of Public Health Sciences at the university and is also principal of Maura Grossman Law in Buffalo, New York. Previously, she was Of Counsel at Wachtell, Lipton, Rosen & Katz, where she pioneered the use of technology-assisted review (TAR) for electronic discovery.

Grossman's research with Gordon V. Cormack has been cited in cases of first impression in United States, Ireland, and (by reference), in the United Kingdom and Australia, approving the use of technology-assisted review in civil litigation. Grossman served as a special master in the Southern District of New York "to assist with issues concerning Technology-Assisted Review (TAR), also known as predictive coding."

In 2015 and 2016, Grossman served as a coordinator for the Total Recall Track at the National Institute of Standards and Technology's Text Retrieval Conference (TREC). In 2010 and 2011, she served as a coordinator for the Legal Track at TREC; in 2008 and 2009, she served as a subject-matter expert.

Grossman is an adjunct professor at Osgoode Hall Law School of York University. Previously, she was a lecturer in law at Columbia University Law School and an adjunct professor of Law at Georgetown University Law Center, where she taught electronic discovery. She also has taught at Pace Law School and Rutgers School of Law - Newark.

Grossman received her J.D., magna cum laude, Order of the Coif, from Georgetown University Law School in 1999. Prior to commencing her law career, Grossman received her M.A. and Ph.D. from the Gordon F. Derner Institute of Advanced Psychological Studies at Adelphi University in 1982 and 1984, respectively, and practiced as a clinical psychologist and hospital administrator until she began her law studies in 1996. Grossman holds an A.B., magna cum laude, from Brown University (1980).
