= Lorna G. Schofield =

American judge (born 1956)

Lorna Schofield
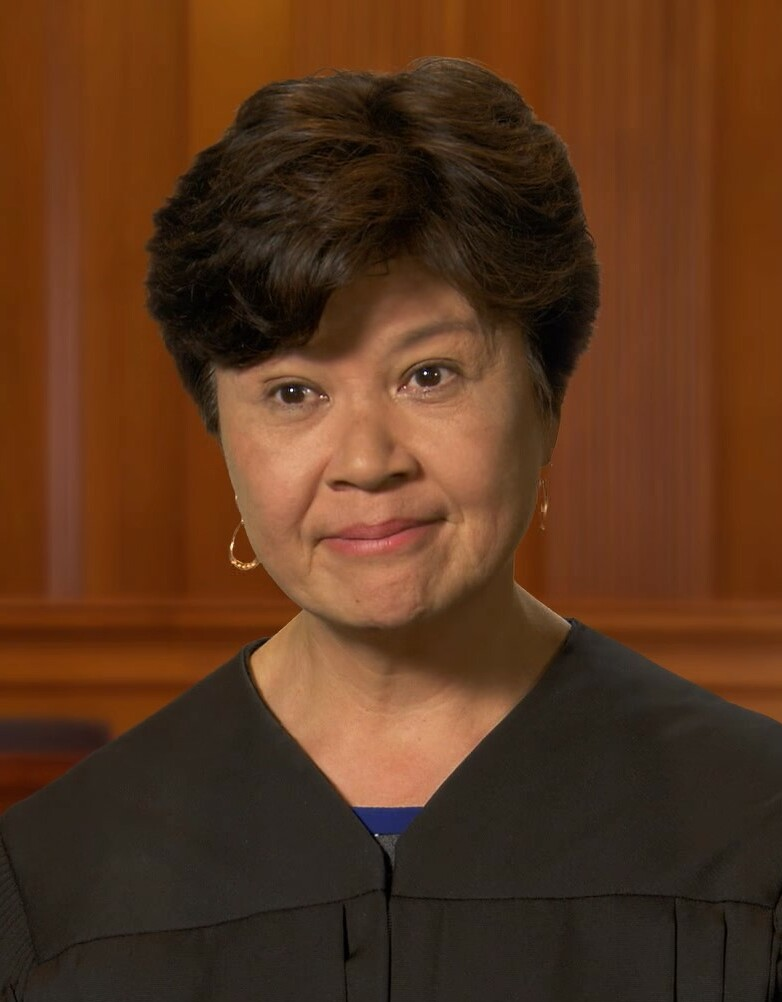
- Schofield in 2016

Senior Judge of the United States District Court for the Southern District of New York
- Incumbent
- Assumed office January 1, 2025

Judge of the United States District Court for the Southern District of New York
- In office December 13, 2012 – January 1, 2025
- Appointed by: Barack Obama
- Preceded by: Shira Scheindlin
- Succeeded by: vacant

Personal details
- Born: Lorna Gail Tiangco Schofield; 1956 (age 69–70) Fort Wayne, Indiana, U.S.
- Education: Indiana University, Bloomington (BA); New York University (JD)

Lorna Gail Tiangco Schofield (born 1956) is a senior United States district judge of the United States District Court for the Southern District of New York.

== Biography ==
Schofield was born in 1956, grew up in New Haven, Indiana, and graduated from New Haven Senior High School in 1974. She was elected as Governor of Hoosier Girls State, a program of the American Legion Auxiliary, in 1973. Schofield received her Bachelor of Arts degree from Indiana University in 1977. She received her Juris Doctor from the New York University School of Law in 1981.

From 1981 to 1984, she was an associate at the law firm of Cleary, Gottlieb, Steen & Hamilton. From 1984 to 1988, she served as an assistant United States attorney for the Southern District of New York, prosecuting domestic terrorism, smuggling and tax fraud. She became an associate at the law firm of Debevoise & Plimpton LLP in New York City in 1988 and was promoted to partner in 1991. She specialized in complex civil litigation and white collar criminal defense.

In addition, she has been heavily involved with the American Bar Association, holding a number of leadership positions, including Chair of the Section on Litigation.

=== Federal judicial service ===
On April 25, 2012, President Barack Obama nominated Schofield to serve as a United States district judge of the United States District Court for the Southern District of New York, to the seat vacated by Judge Shira A. Scheindlin. Schofield is the first Filipino American in the history of the United States to serve as an Article III federal judge. Schofield testified before the United States Senate Judiciary Committee on June 6, 2012. The committee reported Schofield's nomination to the full Senate on July 12, 2012. The Senate confirmed Schofield on December 13, 2012, by a 91–0 vote. She received her commission on December 13, 2012. She assumed senior status on January 1, 2025.

== See also ==
- List of Asian American jurists
- List of first women lawyers and judges in New York
- List of first women lawyers and judges in the United States

Legal offices
Preceded by Shira Scheindlin	Judge of the United States District Court for the Southern District of New York; 2012–2025	Vacant
