= Gordon Cormack =

Canadian computer scientist

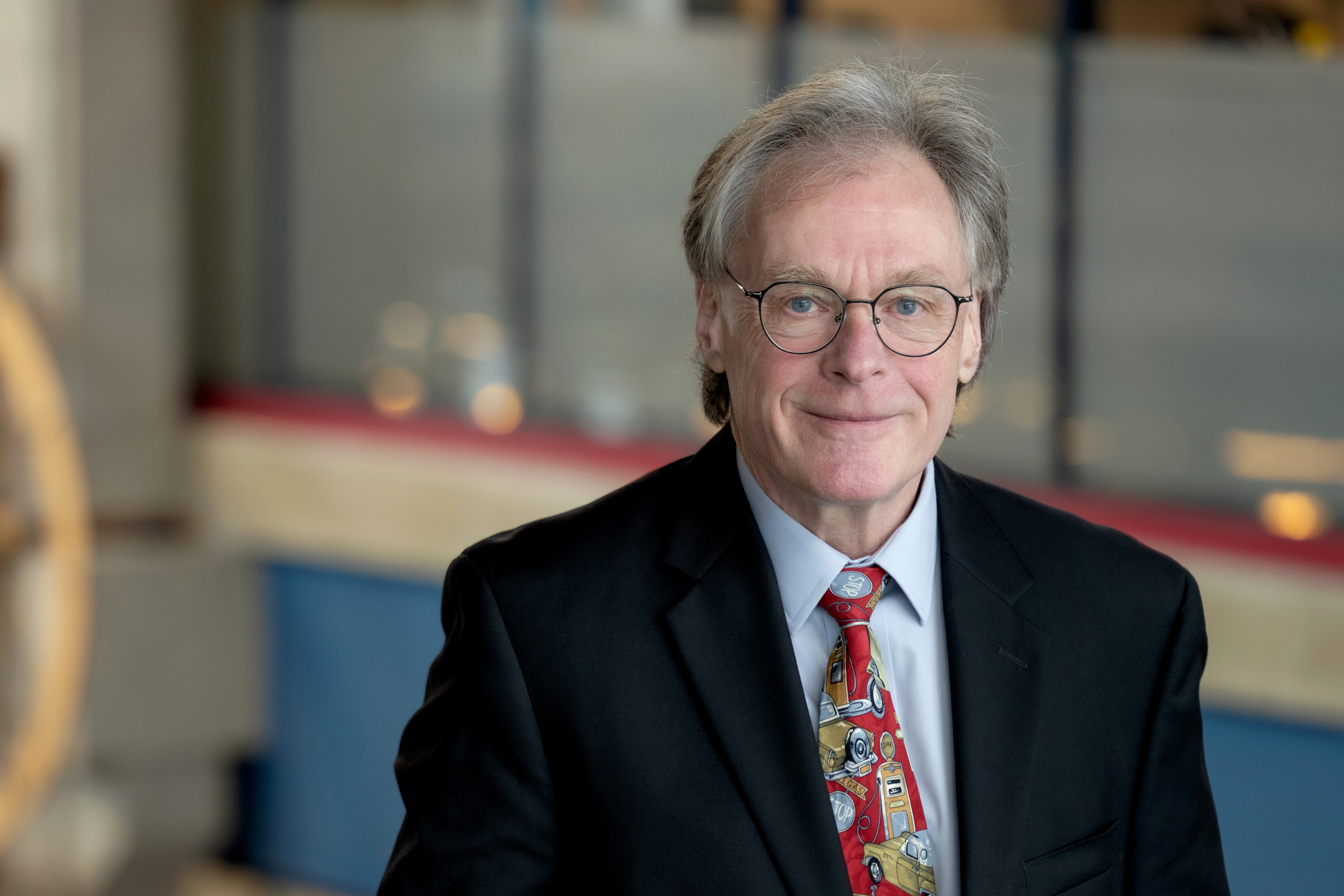
- Professor Emeritus Gordon Cormack
- Known for: Programming languages, big data structures, information retrieval
- Scientific career
- Workplaces: Cheriton School of Computer Science, University of Waterloo

Gordon Villy Cormack is a professor emeritus in the David R. Cheriton School of Computer Science at the University of Waterloo and co-inventor of Dynamic Markov Compression.

Cormack’s research has included high- stakes information retrieval, with an emphasis on the reliability and thoroughness of retrieval methods.

Cormack's research with Maura R. Grossman has been cited in cases of first impression in United States, Ireland, and (by reference) United Kingdom approving the use of technology-assisted review in civil litigation.

Since 2001, he has been a program committee member of The Text Retrieval Conference (TREC). He was a coordinator of the TREC Total Recall Track (2015 - 2016), as well as the TREC Legal Track (2010 - 2011), and the TREC Spam Track (2005 - 2007). Cormack is past president of the Conference on Email and Anti-Spam.

From 1997 through 2010, Cormack coached Waterloo's ACM International Collegiate Programming Contest team, qualifying for the World Finals every year, winning the World Championship in 1999, and the North American Championship in 1998 and 2000.

Cormack was a member of the International Olympiad in Informatics Scientific Committee from 2004 - 2011 and was the scientific director of IOI 2010 in Waterloo, Ontario.

In 2021, Cormack co-authored an analysis on the legal validity, reliability, and evidence based acceptances of artificial intelligence applications in civil and criminal litigation for the Northwestern Journal of Technology and Intellectual Property alongside Maura R. Grossman and U.S. District Judge Paul W. Grimm.

Cormack received his B.Sc., M.Sc., and Ph.D. in computer science from University of Manitoba in 1977, 1978, and 1981, and was a faculty member in the McGill University School of Computer Science (1981 - 1983) before joining University of Waterloo in 1983.

== See also ==
- List of University of Waterloo people
