= Company code of conduct =

A company code of conduct is a document written up voluntarily by a company in which it sets out a set of principles that it commits itself to follow, or requires its employees to follow. In some cases, codes of conduct reach suppliers, subcontractors, and third parties. It is a type of code of conduct.

== Contents ==
The content of a company code of conduct varies and depends in a measure of the company's culture and on the country in which they reside. In general terms, it can be said that the codes of conduct are related to anti-corruption issues, labor law, environmental and basic legal issues, such as the rejection of slavery, child labor, compliance with the environmental standards of each country, and in general, respect for national laws.

== Cases ==
=== Nike ===
Nike's code and Code Leadership Standards set minimum requirements for facilities. In the early 1990s, Nike was reported by the press in the United States for using contractors in Southeast Asia who employed slave labor and child labor. This complaint damaged Nike's image and was reflected in a significant drop in sales. As part of a strategy to recover their image, Nike announced a company code of conduct, in which it stated its commitment to adjust the company's actions around the world to adhere to its rules, as well as to require all subcontractors to do the same, in 1992 (Nike directly employs 22,000 employees and indirectly 450,000 workers through subcontractors around the world.) Shortly afterward, a series of criticisms was received from the unions about the content of its code of conduct, and so Nike created a new text which is the one that is currently presented.

=== Faithless servant ===
In Morgan Stanley v. Skowron, 989 F. Supp. 2d 356 (S.D.N.Y. 2013), applying New York's faithless servant doctrine, the court held that a hedge fund's employee engaging in insider trading in violation of his company's code of conduct, which also required him to report his misconduct, must repay his employer the full $31 million his employer paid him as compensation during his period of faithlessness.

== Monitoring ==
One of the first issues that was raised by the company code of conduct was monitoring compliance. It has been considered that it is not reliable that the monitoring is conducted by the company itself. Some companies reach out to external companies to conduct monitoring. In other cases, companies have accepted that certain NGOs proceed with monitoring, but unions have complained that this activity of NGOs has been used repeatedly as an alternative to trade union action and to replace the union in front of the workers.

== Issues ==
Codes of conduct are related to corporate social responsibility. A couple of investigations have pointed out that codes of conduct carry the risk of displacing the importance of mandatory national and international standards.

The United Nations Research Institute for Social Development (UNRISD) estimated a few hundred existing company code of conduct. The UNCTAD estimated 65,000 parent companies which own about 850,000 subsidiary are foreigners in all countries around the world, and employ the majority of their workers through outsourcing.

Trade unions and some NGOs have criticized the unilateral nature of codes of conduct and have emphasized that they are often only aimed to improve the public image of businesses. The non-inclusion of suppliers, subcontractors and outsourced companies in codes of conduct has also been pointed out by trade unions and NGOs as a serious disadvantage, as it is precisely where the majority of workers work and where they produce the majority of violations. The legal validity of the same and the ways to enforce compliance is also being discussed.

== See also ==
- Banking Code
- Global Compact
- Guidelines for Multinational Enterprises of OECD
- Don't be evil
