= Sedona Canada Principles =

The Sedona Canada Principles are a set of authoritative guidelines published by The Sedona Conference to aid members of the Canadian legal community involved in the identification, collection, preservation, review and production of electronically stored information (ESI). The principles were drafted by a small group of lawyers, judges and technologists called the Sedona Working Group 7 or Sedona Canada. Sedona Canada is an offshoot of The Sedona Conference which is an American "non-profit ... research and educational institute dedicated to the advanced study of law and policy in the areas of antitrust law, complex litigation, and intellectual property rights".

== Background ==
Civil procedure in Canada is jurisdictional with each province following its own rules of civil procedure. However, each province must address the fact that due to the advancement of technology the discovery process enshrined in the rules of civil procedure can be potentially derailed due to the sheer volume of electronically stored information (ESI). When dealing with litigation matters that involve electronically stored information (ESI), the discovery process is commonly called e-discovery. The problems associated with e-discovery in Canada led to the creation of the Sedona Canada Principles. Rule 29.1.03(4) of the wikibooks:Ontario Rules of Civil Procedure specifically refers to the Sedona Canada Principles in referencing Principles re Electronic Discovery although it has been reported that this rule has been largely ignored in practice.

== Summary ==
The Sedona Canada Principles largely refer to the processes found in the Electronic Discovery Reference Model.

The principles urge proportionality due to the potentially enormous volumes of documents that may be discoverable when dealing with ESI. They also encourage good faith in the document preservation stage and regular meetings between parties to discuss the scope of the litigation. Parties are urged to be aware of the potential costs involved in producing relevant ESI but are advised that only reasonably accessible ESI need be produced. The principles stipulate that parties should not be required to search for or collect deleted material unless there is an agreement or court order related to those terms. The use of electronic tools and processes such as data sampling and web harvesting are acceptable practices. Parties are encouraged to agree early in the litigation process on production format required for the exchange of relevant documents as part of the discovery process (native files, pdf, tiff, metadata requirements etc.). Agreements or direction should be sought, if necessary, with respect to privilege or other confidential information related to production of electronic documents and data. Parties should be aware that legal precedents can be formed as a result of e-discovery practices and sanctions can be considered for a party's failure to meet their discovery obligations unless it can be demonstrated that the failure was not intentional. All parties must bear the “reasonable” costs associated with e-discovery but other arrangements can be agreed upon by the parties or by court order.

== Caselaw ==
In Warman v. National Post Company proportionality was at issue in a case where the plaintiff was suing the defendant for libel. A motion was brought by the defendant to have the plaintiff provide a mirror image of his hard drive in an effort to prove an internet article was indeed authored by the plaintiff. Issues of proportionality and the work of the Sedona Conference and Sedona Canada Principles were factored in to the decision to grant the defendant only limited access to the hard drive.

In Innovative Health Group Inc. v. Calgary Health Region the plaintiff's legal obligation to produce imaged hard drives is in question. Justice Conrad refers to the advice of Sedona Canada on proportionality and problems associated with time and expense related to the difficulties associated with electronically stored information.

In York University v. Michael Markicevic Justice Brown specifically refers to the need for the parties to agree upon a formal e-discovery plan to be drafted in consultation with Sedona Canada Principles.

In Friends of Lansdowne v. Ottawa Master MacLeod refers to the need for Sedona Canada principles and states “This is particularly true in the current information age when e-mail is ubiquitous and multiple copies or variants of messages may be held on various kinds of data storage devices including individual hard drives, e-mail and Blackberry servers. Even documents that ultimately exist in paper form normally begin their life on computers and negotiations frequently involve exchanges of electronic drafts. To find every scrap of paper and every electronic trace of relevant information has become a nightmarish task that threatens to render any kind of litigation extravagantly expensive.”

== Criticism ==
Critics of the Sedona Canada Principles believe they should address system integrity and that the true history of any file preserved cannot be identified without proof of the integrity of the electronic record systems management it comes from.

Other criticism is more directed to the Sedona Canada working group and complaints that it is insular and irrelevant.
