= Zubulake v. UBS Warburg =

US court case, 2003–2005

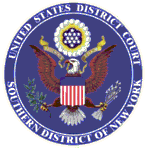
- Court: United States District Court for the Southern District of New York

Case history
- Subsequent action: N/A

Court membership
- Judge sitting: Shira Scheindlin

Case opinions
- Series of groundbreaking opinions by Judge Shira Scheindlin, including Zubulake I, Zubulake III, Zubulake IV, and Zubulake V

Zubulake v. UBS Warburg is a case heard between 2003 and 2005 in the United States District Court for the Southern District of New York. Judge Shira Scheindlin, presiding over the case, issued a series of groundbreaking opinions in the field of electronic discovery. Plaintiff Laura Zubulake filed suit against her former employer UBS, alleging sex discrimination, failure to promote, and retaliation. Judge Shira Scheindlin's rulings comprise some of the most often cited in the area of electronic discovery, and were made prior to the 2006 amendments to the Federal Rules of Civil Procedure. The relevant opinions in the field are known as Zubulake I, Zubulake III, Zubulake IV, and Zubulake V. In 2012, the plaintiff published a book about her e-discovery experiences titled Zubulake's e-Discovery: The Untold Story of my Quest for Justice.

== Summary ==
=== Zubulake I and III ===
In an employment discrimination suit against her former employer, Laura Zubulake, the plaintiff, argued that key evidence was located in various emails exchanged among employees of UBS, the defendant. Initially, the defendant produced about 350 pages of documents, including approximately 100 pages of email. However, the plaintiff alone had produced approximately 450 pages of email correspondence. The plaintiff requested UBS to locate the documents that existed in backup tapes and other archiving media.

The defendant, arguing undue burden and expense, requested the court to shift the cost of production to the plaintiff, citing the Rowe decision. The court stated that whether the production of documents is unduly burdensome or expensive "turns primarily on whether it is kept in an accessible or inaccessible format". The court concluded that the issue of accessibility depends on the media on which data are stored. It described five categories of electronic repositories: (1) online data, including hard disks; (2) near-line data, including optical disks; (3) offline storage, such as magnetic tapes; (4) backup tapes; (5) fragmented, erased and damaged data. The last two were considered inaccessible, that is, not readily available and thus subject to cost-shifting. The court, then discussing the Rowe decision (the balance test), concluded that it needed modification and created a new seven-factor test:

1. The extent to which the request is specifically tailored to discover relevant information;
2. The availability of such information from other sources;
3. The total cost of production, compared to the amount in controversy;
4. The total cost of production, compared to the resources available to each party;
5. The relative ability of each party to control costs and its incentive to do so;
6. The importance of the issues at stake in the litigation; and
7. The relative benefits to the parties of obtaining the information.

The defendant was ordered to produce, at its own expense, all responsive email existing on its optical disks, servers, and five backup tapes as selected by the plaintiff. The court would only conduct a cost-shifting analysis after the review of the contents of the backup tapes.

After the results of the sample restoration, both parties wanted the other to fully pay for the remaining backup email. The sample cost the defendant about $19,003 for restoration but the estimate costs for the production was $273,649, including attorney and paralegal review costs. After applying the seven–factor test, it determined that the plaintiff should account for 25 percent of the restoration and searching costs, excluding attorney review costs.

=== Zubulake IV ===
During the restoration effort, as described in the court's prior opinions (see Zubulake I and III), the parties learned that some backup tapes were no longer available. The parties also concluded that relevant emails created after the initial proceedings had been deleted from UBS's email system and were only accessible on backup tapes. The plaintiff then sought an order requiring UBS to pay for the total costs of restoring the remaining backup tapes. In addition, Laura Zubulake sought an adverse inference instruction against UBS and the costs for re-deposing some individuals due to the destruction of evidence.

The court found that the defendant had a duty to preserve evidence since it should have known that it would be relevant for future litigation. However, the court concluded that the plaintiff failed to demonstrate that the lost evidence supported the adverse inference instruction claim. The court ordered the defendant to cover the costs as claimed by the plaintiff.

=== Zubulake V ===
Here, the court concluded that UBS had failed to take all necessary steps to guarantee that relevant data was both preserved and produced, and granted the plaintiff's motion for sanctions. Specifically, the court ruled that the jury would be given an adverse inference instruction, sought in Zubulake IV, due to the deleted evidence (emails and tapes) and inability to recover key documents during the course of the case. Furthermore, it ruled that UBS was accountable for paying the costs of any depositions or re-depositions required by its late production of email, and that UBS reimburse plaintiff for the costs of the motion. Laura Zubulake contended that UBS, which recovered some of the deleted relevant emails, prejudiced her case by producing recovered emails long after the initial document requests. Additionally, parts of important communication exchanged between key parties was never recovered, including an email that would reveal a relevant conversation about the employee.

In addition, the court noted that the defense counsel was partly to be blamed for the document destruction because it had failed in its duty to locate and preserve relevant information. In addressing the role of counsel in litigation, the court stated that "[c]ounsel must take affirmative steps to monitor compliance so that all sources of discoverable information are identified and searched". Specifically, the court concluded that attorneys are obligated to ensure all relevant documents are discovered, retained, and produced. Further, the court suggested that litigators must guarantee that relevant documents are preserved by instituting a litigation hold on key data, and safeguarding archival media.

=== The outcome ===
Finally, the court concluded that the defendant deliberately acted in destroying relevant information and failing to follow the instructions and demonstrate care on preserving and recovering key documents. As a result, Judge Shira Scheindlin ordered an adverse inference instruction against UBS Warburg. In the final instructions to the jury the Court instructed in part, "[i]f you find that UBS could have produced this evidence, the evidence was within its control, and the evidence would have been material in deciding facts in dispute in this case, you are permitted, but not required, to infer that the evidence would have been unfavorable to UBS." In addition, the court awarded plaintiff monetary sanctions for reimbursement of costs of additional re-depositions and of the motion leading to this opinion, including attorney fees. The jury found in Zubulake's favor on both claims awarding compensatory and punitive awards. .

== Electronic discovery issues ==
The case has set important practices relating to both the legal and technical aspects of electronic discovery, as the relevant communication among interested parties was available in digital form. The main issues raised were:

- The scope of a party's duty to preserve digital evidence during the course of litigation or even when first acknowledged that a chance of litigation exists;
- Lawyer's duty to monitor their clients' compliance with electronic data preservation and production (litigation hold);
- Data sampling, so that knowledge about costs and effectiveness of the recovering process are known in advance;
- The ability for the disclosing party to shift the costs to the requesting party of recovering inaccessible media (backup tapes, for example);
- The imposition of sanctions for the spoliation of digital evidence.

== See also ==
- Rules of evidence
- Discovery (law)
- Electronic discovery
