= Document review =

Process in legal proceedings

Document review (also known as doc review), in the context of legal proceedings, is the process whereby each party to a case sorts through and analyzes the documents and data they possess (and later the documents and data supplied by their opponents through discovery) to determine which are sensitive or otherwise relevant to the case. Document review is a valuable main staple of the type of work performed by attorneys for their clients, though it is increasingly common for the work to be performed by specialized document review attorneys.

Some types of cases that typically require large numbers of documents to be reviewed are litigation, mergers and acquisitions, and government and internal investigations (including internal audits). Regarding litigation, documents reviewed by attorneys are obtained through the discovery process, which is generally governed by rules of procedure for the presiding court. In cases in United States Federal Courts the rules related to discovery are Federal Rules of Civil Procedure (F.R.C.P.) 16, 26, 33, 34, 37, and 45 which were amended in 2006 to include electronically stored information.

Though attorneys do still review hard copy documents today, most documents are reviewed electronically either as native files that were originally created electronically or as electronic copies of documents that were originally created in a hard copy format. During the doc review process, each document may be tagged according to certain categories, including whether it is relevant to an issue in the case, whether it is responsive to a discovery request (and therefore may need to be produced as part of the discovery process), whether it is confidential, or whether it is attorney–client or otherwise privileged. When large amounts of documents need to be reviewed electronically, often a system is set up that includes review software. This system is known as a platform. The terms electronic discovery and technology assisted review have arisen to reflect the dominance of electronically stored information and the increasing use of machine learning and other technologies to help curb the growing cost of document review.

At times, even with the use of electronic document review platforms the volume of documents that need to be reviewed by an attorney for a case can be expansive and many attorneys including even highly staffed international law firms will need to obtain assistance beyond their standard resources. In these instances other attorneys are often brought into the case to assist specifically with the review of the documents. Traditionally, the additional attorneys needed to assist were hired on directly by attorneys and firms, or they may have worked as independent contractors. In recent years, many legal staffing companies have begun to act as intermediary employers between the law firms and the attorneys hired to assist with the document review. This trend has led to controversy in the legal profession as more and more of the work traditionally performed by U.S. attorneys is being outsourced to countries like India as a result of the legal staffing companies attempting to drive the rates down to remain competitive.

Traditional markets in the United States where many attorneys and firms typically hire additional attorneys to assist with document review are Washington, D.C., New York City, Los Angeles, Houston, and Chicago. In Canada many attorneys assist with document review in Toronto.

In Europe the biggest market for document review is typically London.

During the COVID-19 pandemic, remote document review, once considered an unmanageable process, became far more commonplace, enabling reviewers to work from home while saving companies the cost of office space and on-site management.
