= Catalyst Repository Systems =

US software company

Catalyst Repository Systems, Inc.
- Type: Subsidiary
- Industry: legal, computer software e-discovery
- Founded: Denver, Colorado (2000)
- Headquarters: 1860 Blake Street, 7th Floor; Denver, Colorado, USA; 3F Mod Marche Building, 2-8-3 Akasaka, Minato-ku, Tokyo 107-0052
- Area served: Worldwide
- Key people: John Barr, CEO; Lewis Visscher, CFO; John Tredennick, Founder and Evangelist
- Number of employees: 170
- Parent: OpenText
- Website: www.catalystsecure.com

Catalyst Repository Systems is a privately held company based in Denver, Colorado, US, which develops, hosts and supports cloud-based software for the management of electronic legal discovery. Founded in 2000, the company’s main product is Insight Discovery. Catalyst has offices and data centers throughout the United States and an office and data center in Tokyo, Japan.

Catalyst technology integrates functionality that covers the Electronic Discovery Reference Model (EDRM), a ubiquitous diagram that represents a conceptual view of the stages involved in the e-discovery process.

Catalyst follows a SOC 2 security framework.

== History ==
In 1998, the Denver-based law firm Holland & Hart developed an internal electronic document repository, which allowed the firm’s lawyers to access and share legal documents and litigation files electronically between offices. Development was led by John Tredennick, a partner in the firm.

In 2000, the firm created a separate business to further develop and commercialize the document repository, and formed CaseShare Systems Inc. Holland & Hart assumed majority ownership of the company, while Tredennick and two other employees owned a minority interest.

In 2005, Tredennick purchased the firm's ownership stake in the business, with backing from the investment capital firm Catalyst Investors. In 2006, CaseShare changed its name to Catalyst Repository Systems to reflect its main product, Catalyst CR. Catalyst CR was the first grid-enabled document repository for discovery.

In 2007, Catalyst launched its multi-language capabilities and in 2010, Catalyst established its Catalyst Asia division, with an office and data center in Tokyo.

In 2012, FTV Capital purchased a majority stake in Catalyst from Catalyst Investors; Catalyst Investors retained a minority stake. Also in 2012, Catalyst launched Catalyst Insight, the first platform to be built around an XML database.

In 2013, Catalyst introduced Insight Predict, the first commercially available predictive coding product based on a continuous active learning protocol.

In 2017, Catalyst launched Insight Discovery, a multi-matter management repository for corporate legal departments.

In 2017, Catalyst also became a full EDRM solution with the addition of legal hold and collection technology by acquiring TotalDiscovery, a Seattle-based legal hold and data collection software company. Also in 2017, Catalyst launched Insight Business Intelligence, a cross-matter reporting and analytics system.

In 2019, Catalyst acquired by OpenText.

== Technology ==
Catalyst has developed several commercial products:

Insight Discovery is a document repository management program which can handle modern complex litigation involving tens of millions of electronic documents and multiple cases or matters. It allows documents to be stored and tagged once and then used in multiple legal matters. Catalyst technology can process, index and search documents involving 280 languages, particularly Asian languages such as Chinese, Japanese and Korean.

Insight Predict is the company’s proprietary predictive coding tool. It was introduced in January 2013 at LegalTech New York. It is used in legal matters to analyze large document populations and identify the documents most likely to be important, thus enabling legal teams to reduce the number of documents they must review.

Insight Legal Hold and Collect is the company’s automated legal hold and data preservation product. It is used to automate legal hold processes, remotely collect and preserve data, search, process and promote potentially relevant documents for review in Insight Discovery.

Insight Business Intelligence is Catalyst’s analytics platform and dashboard that aggregates and analyzes data across legal matters for cross-matter reporting.

Fast Track is Catalyst’s automated site setup and data loading system.

== Services ==
Catalyst offers professional services that support corporations’ use of Catalyst technology. Services include search and analysis, data management, document review and managed services. Catalyst also offers an array of language services, including machine and human translation and management and staffing of multi-language cases.
