= Matthew J. Maddox =

American judge (born 1977)

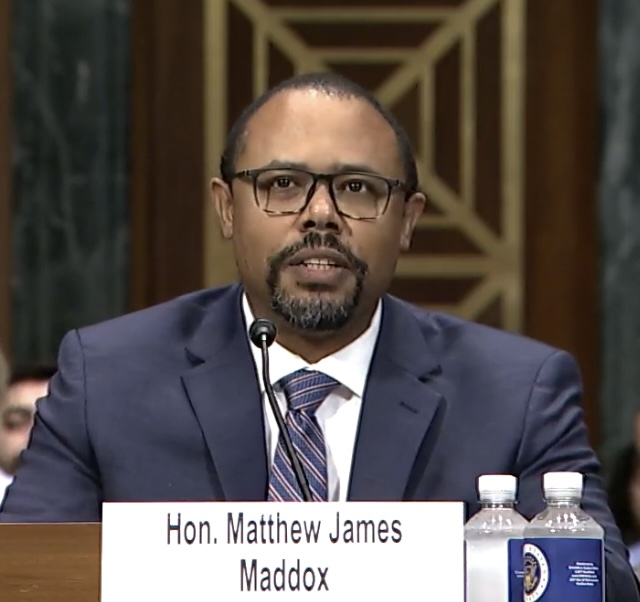

Judge of the United States District Court for the District of Maryland
- Incumbent
- Assumed office November 3, 2023
- Appointed by: Joe Biden
- Preceded by: Paul W. Grimm

Magistrate Judge of the United States District Court for the District of Maryland
- In office February 22, 2022 – November 3, 2023
- Preceded by: Thomas M. DiGirolamo
- Succeeded by: Erin Aslan

Personal details
- Born: Matthew James Maddox; 1977 (age 48–49) Rossville, Maryland, U.S.
- Education: Morgan State University (BA); Yale University (JD)

Matthew James Maddox (born 1977) is an American lawyer from Maryland who has served as a United States district judge of the United States District Court for the District of Maryland since 2023. He previously served as a United States magistrate judge of the same court from 2022 to 2023.

== Education ==
Maddox received a Bachelor of Arts from Morgan State University, summa cum laude, in 1999 where he majored in philosophy and religious studies and minored in psychology. He was a Fulbright Scholar and taught high school through the Teach for America program. Maddox received a Juris Doctor from Yale Law School in 2011.

== Career ==
From 2011 to 2012, he served as a law clerk for Judge Gerald Bruce Lee of the United States District Court for the Eastern District of Virginia and from 2014 to 2015, he served as a law clerk for Judge Andre M. Davis of the United States Court of Appeals for the Fourth Circuit. From 2012 to 2014, he worked as a litigation associate at Holland & Knight LLP. From 2015 to 2022, he served as an assistant United States attorney in the U.S. Attorney's Office for the District of Maryland. Maddox was named the identity theft coordinator in 2018 and deputy chief of the Major Crimes section in 2020.

On February 22, 2022, he was appointed as a United States magistrate judge to fill the vacancy left by the retirement of Judge Thomas M. DiGirolamo.

=== Federal judicial service ===
On March 20, 2023, President Joe Biden announced his intent to nominate Maddox to serve as a United States district judge of the United States District Court for the District of Maryland. On March 21, 2023, his nomination was sent to the Senate. President Biden nominated Maddox to the seat vacated by Judge Paul W. Grimm, who assumed senior status on December 11, 2022. On July 12, 2023, a hearing on his nomination was held before the Senate Judiciary Committee. During his confirmation hearing, Senator Mike Lee questioned Maddox about his past membership with both ACORN and the American Constitution Society. On September 14, 2023, his nomination was reported out of the committee by a 13–8 vote. On October 30, 2023, the United States Senate invoked cloture on his nomination by a 54–40 vote. On October 31, 2023, his nomination was confirmed by a 55–42 vote. He received his judicial commission on November 3, 2023. He was sworn in on November 8, 2023.

== See also ==
- List of African American federal judges
- List of African-American jurists

Legal offices
Preceded by Paul W. Grimm	Judge of the United States District Court for the District of Maryland; 2023–present	Incumbent
