= Financial compensation =

Act of providing a person with things of economic value

Financial compensation refers to the act of providing a person with money or other things of economic value in exchange for their goods, labor, or to provide for the costs of injuries that they have incurred. The aim of financial compensation is the preservation of relationships between those engaged in economic exchange.

Kinds of financial compensation include:

- Damages, legal term for the financial compensation recoverable by reason of another's breach of duty
- Nationalization compensation, compensation paid in the event of nationalization of property
- Payment
- Remuneration
  - Deferred compensation
  - Executive compensation
  - Royalties
  - Salary
  - Wage
  - Employee benefits
- Workers' compensation, to protect employees who have incurred work-related injuries

Financial compensation is often provided after service delivery failure in order to regain customer trust. An associated response is to offer an apology that communicates the transgressor feels remorse.

Financial compensation may be offered as an incentive. Some offers are too good to refuse. They may become an undue inducement in which they distort people's judgment, contravene their interests and thereby cause harm.

Financial compensation may be imposed by a judge, before a court, to a victim.

== See also ==
- Income
- Faithless servant
