= Dahlia Scheindlin =

American-Israeli journalist

Dahlia Scheindlin (Hebrew: דליה שיינדלין) is an American-Israeli political consultant, pollster, and journalist; she is the author of The Crooked Timber of Democracy in Israel, Promise Unfulfilled. She supports liberal causes and is an advocate of a confederation of two states as a solution to the Israeli-Palestinian conflict. She is a regular columnist at Haaretz newspaper.

== Early life and education ==
Scheindlin is from New York. Her mother is Judge Shira Scheindlin, who in 2014 ruled that stop and frisk is unconstitutional. Her father, Raymond, is professor emeritus at the Jewish Theological Seminary. She received a BA from McGill University in comparative religion and an MA from Harvard Divinity School. She moved to Israel in 1997 and later received a PhD in political science from Tel Aviv University. She began working in public opinion research and political campaigns in 1999, and has consulted on nine national campaigns in Israel, in addition to polling for electoral and public affairs campaigns in 15 other countries.

== Career ==
=== Political consultant ===
Scheindlin was a political consultant on nine Israeli national elections over 26 years. She has done similar work in 15 countries and regions. She has had fellowships at Columbia University, Mitvim, the University of Pennsylvania, and The Century Foundation.

=== Polling ===
Scheindlin has conducted extensive public opinion and policy research on the Israeli–Palestinian conflict including, since 2016, participating in a 25-year-old series of Israeli-Palestinian public opinion surveys with the Palestinian Center for Policy and Survey Research. Findings indicated declining support for the two-state solution. Polling in 2024 showed strong support for the Gaza war, but support for Israeli leadership at its lowest level ever.

=== Journalism ===
Scheindlin has written for Foreign Affairs, The New York Times, Haaretz, The Guardian, Time, and other publications. She is the co-founder of +972 Magazine, a left-wing news and opinion online magazine established in 2010.

=== Writings ===
- Gaza war: "October 7 was a watershed moment that startled Israeli Jews and has been manipulated and fetishized for political gain since it occurred." "The government has abandoned the hostages and the people in general, for its own political survival." She has called Israeli leaders of the war effort "madmen".
- Confederated two-state solution: Scheindlin recognizes the difficulty of getting Israeli and Palestinian support for the idea, but has said "that doesn't mean we should not try". She believes the two-state solution is dead. The best option is a Palestinian-Israeli confederation.
- Oslo Accords: She feels the accords should have been a path to peace. But since 1993 Israeli governments have been using it as a cover for the occupation, "enabling Israel's profound penetration into Palestinian life, through physical, military, bureaucratic, and cyber-surveillance mechanisms" and maintaining "Israel's military control over all of the West Bank, and over Gaza by controlling its borders, airspace, and seaports." She describes this as a betrayal of the accords' intent.
- The Israeli left: Scheindlin says that in Israel, the "left" stands for the idea that Palestinians and Israelis can split their differences and their land, live more peacefully if not perfectly, and perhaps one day reconcile. "I have held these views for my entire adult life, and have spent my career working with political parties, civil society groups, and media outlets advocating them—which can sometimes lead to despair."
- Democracy: In her book The Crooked Timber of Democracy in Israel, she documents the flaws and missing pillars of democracy in Israel from pre-state Zionism through to the mass democracy movement of 2023. But she says, "Zionism cannot be predicated on preventing the self-determination of Palestinians and still be democratic" and that Israel is "democratic enough to know how undemocratic it is".
