= Faithless servant =

American legal doctrine

The faithless servant doctrine pursuant to which employees who act unfaithfully towards their employers must forfeit to their employers all compensation received during the period of disloyalty. It is under the laws of a number of states in the United States, and most notably New York State law.

== History and application ==
The faithless service doctrine is a very old common law doctrine that springs out of agency law. It is a doctrine under the laws of a number of states in the United States, most notably New York State law, pursuant to which an employee who acts unfaithfully towards his or her employer must forfeit all of the compensation received during the period of disloyalty. That period of disloyalty during which equitable forfeiture of all compensation is calculated is the period "from the date of the agent’s first disloyal act, and 'a fiduciary may be required to disgorge any ill-gotten gain even where the plaintiff has sustained no direct economic loss'."

== Application in New York State ==
In a case from the 19th century that is still referred to today, Murray v. Beard, 7 N.E. 553, 554-55 (N.Y. 1886), the New York Court of Appeals held that a broker could not recover commissions from his employer: "An agent is held to uberrima fides in his dealings with his principal; and if he acts adversely to his employer in any part of the transaction ... it amounts to such a fraud upon the principal, as to forfeit any right to compensation for services."

In Astra USA v. Bildman, 914 N.E.2d 36 (Mass. 2009), applying New York's faithless servant doctrine, the court held that a company's employee who had engaged in financial misdeeds and sexual harassment must "forfeit all of his salary and bonuses for the period of disloyalty." The court held that was the case even if the employee "otherwise performed valuable services," and the employee was not entitled to recover restitution for the value of those other services. The decision attracted a good deal of attention by legal commentators.

Similarly, in Morgan Stanley v. Skowron, 989 F. Supp. 2d 356 (S.D.N.Y. 2013), the leading case by a New York federal district court applying New York's faithless servant doctrine in Manhattan in the Southern District of New York, United States District Judge Shira Scheindlin held that a hedge fund's employee engaging in insider trading in violation of his company's code of conduct, which also required him to report his misconduct, must repay his employer the full $31 million his employer paid him as compensation during his period of faithlessness. Judge Scheindlin called the insider trading the "ultimate abuse of a portfolio manager's position." The judge also wrote, "In addition to exposing Morgan Stanley to government investigations and direct financial losses, Skowron's behavior damaged the firm's reputation, a valuable corporate asset."

The doctrine was applied as well in Mahn v. Major, Lindsey, & Africa, 2018 N.Y. App. Div. LEXIS 1713 (1st Dep’t Mar. 20, 2018), which involved a legal recruiter accused of disseminating proprietary information to competitors in return for kickbacks. She was required to pay back her employer more than $2.7 million.

== Application in other states ==
The faithless servant doctrine has also been applied by courts in California, Maryland, Georgia, Missouri, New Jersey, and Oregon. Courts in other states have chosen to apply the doctrine in part, and Connecticut, Florida, and Rhode Island have chosen not to adopt the doctrine.
