= Chip Skowron =

Former American Manager of FrontPoint Partners

- Born: Joseph F. Skowron III; 1968 or 1969 (age 56–57); Cocoa, Florida
- Education: Vanderbilt University; Yale University Medical School; Yale Graduate School
- Occupation: Hedge fund portfolio manager
- Employer: FrontPoint Partners LLC
- Known for: Convicted for insider trading; Required to pay back his employer $31 million—100% of the compensation he earned—because his insider trading resulted in him being a "faithless servant" under New York law.
- Criminal charge: Conspiracy to engage in insider trading and obstruction of justice
- Criminal penalty: Five years in prison followed by three years of supervised release; $5 million to be paid to the government; $2.7 million SEC penalty; restitution to be paid to Morgan Stanley for legal fees ($3.8 million) and 20% of his compensation ($6.4 million).
- Criminal status: Convicted; released from prison after serving term
- Spouse: Cheryl
- Children: two daughters; two sons

Joseph F. "Chip" Skowron III (c. 1968) is an American former hedge fund co-portfolio manager of FrontPoint Partners LLC's health care funds. He was convicted of insider trading, for which he served five years in prison. He was also required to repay his hedge fund employer $32 million it had paid him in compensation, because he had been a “faithless servant.”

== Early and personal life ==
Skowron was born and grew up in Cocoa, Florida, and attended Cocoa High School. He earned his undergraduate degree from Vanderbilt University in 1990.

He then attended and graduated from Yale University Medical School in 1998 with a medical degree, and from Yale Graduate School with a doctorate in cellular biology. Skowron spent three years in an orthopedic residency at Beth Israel Deaconess Medical Center, one of Harvard Medical School's teaching hospitals, leaving in 2001 before finishing the residency. He published a number of medical papers, including "Cloning and characterization of mouse brush border myosin-I in adult and embryonic intestine." He was a member of the board of directors of Americares, a non-profit disaster relief and global health organization.

Skowron resides in Greenwich, Connecticut. He has a wife, Cheryl, and two daughters and two sons.

== Hedge fund career ==
After leaving his residency Skowron worked as a healthcare analyst at SAC Capital Management in Stamford, Connecticut, and then at Millennium Partners in New York, for less than one year at each.

Skowron then became a hedge fund co-portfolio manager of Greenwich, Connecticut-based FrontPoint Partners LLC's health care funds. He joined FrontPoint in 2003, co-founding its health care team and taking on the title of managing director at Morgan Stanley, its owner, which bought the firm for $400 million in 2006. He was paid in part based on the performance of the funds he managed, earning $13.5 million in 2007 and $7 million in 2008.

== Insider trading ==
In April 2011, he was arrested by the FBI. Skowron was charged with securities fraud and conspiracy to obstruct justice by the U.S. Attorney for the Southern District of New York. According to court filings he also lied to his employer about his insider trades, and lied under oath to the Securities and Exchange Commission. He was released on a $6 million bond.

According to the government, Skowron sold shares of Human Genome Sciences Inc. in 2007 and 2008 after being tipped off by a consultant to the company that the company was about to make a negative announcement regarding its clinical trial for the drug Albumin Interferon Alfa 2-a, a potential drug to treat hepatitis-C, before the announcement was made. As a result, FrontPoint's hedge funds were able to avoid $30 million in losses, according to the government.

At first Skowron denied the charges against him, and his defense attorney said he would plead not guilty, saying "We look forward to responding to the allegations more fully in court at the appropriate time". However, after the doctor charged with tipping him off pleaded guilty, he changed his position, and admitted his guilt.

The U.S. Attorney charged the consultant with tipping Skowron material, non-public information concerning pharmaceutical company Human Genome Science's clinical trial. The consultant agreed to plead guilty to a four-count criminal information, and agreed to cooperate with the government's investigation.

In August 2011, Skowron pleaded guilty in federal court in Manhattan to conspiracy to engage in insider trading and obstruction of justice. Preet Bharara, U.S. Attorney for the Southern District of New York, said: "Chip Skowron is the latest example of a portfolio manager willing to pay for proprietary, non-public information that gave him an illegal trading edge over the average investor. The integrity of our market is damaged by people who engage in insider trading...." Skowron was sent to prison for five years. Skowron's wife asked the judge to be lenient with him, saying her husband didn't realize he was doing anything that could result in him going to prison. Skowron also agreed to forfeit $5 million to the government and pay a $2.7 million SEC penalty. The judge, noting that Morgan Stanley's "expectation was that Skowron would abide by policies" that "prohibited insider trading," also ordered him to pay restitution to Morgan Stanley for legal fees ($3.8 million), and 20% of his compensation during the period of the conspiracy from 2007 to 2010 ($6.4 million). The awards were upheld on appeal.

Skowron, sentenced in November 2011 by Judge Denise Cote to, and served, five years in federal prison at medium-security Schuylkill Federal Prison Camp in Minersville, Pennsylvania. He was released in 2017, subject to three years of supervised release. He was prohibited from working in the securities industry.

Institutional investors immediately withdrew $3 billion from FrontPoint, which until that time had $7 billion in assets under management and earlier had $11 billion under management, causing it to shut down in May 2011, after Skowron's arrest.

Skowron later said: "Over 200 people lost their jobs because of me. My wife and my children endured extraordinary embarrassment, isolation, and absence because of my choices because of the empire I thought I needed to build." His country club ejected him.

FrontPoint, which was spun off from Morgan Stanley, stressed that the FrontPoint Healthcare Funds were not charged with any securities law violations, and that Skowron breached FrontPoint's compliance policies and Code of Conduct. The FrontPoint Healthcare Funds were named solely as relief defendants, and agreed to make a disgorgement payment with prejudgment interest to the SEC for the alleged losses avoided, and paid the SEC $33 million in an enforcement action.

== Faithless servant lawsuit ==
Morgan Stanley filed a separate civil lawsuit in October 2012 seeking the $33 million it paid the SEC, as well as the entire $32 million it had paid Skowron in compensation from 2007 to 2010. In its lawsuit, Morgan Stanley called Skowron a “faithless servant” who lied repeatedly to continue being paid by Morgan Stanley and to avoid a blow to his reputation. A. Jeff Ifrah, co-author of Federal Sentencing for Business Crimes, said: "The reputation of an employer like this one can get killed by the conduct of its employee," and seeking restitution "is certainly a good strategy" to recover a company's good reputation.

In December 2013 Judge Shira Scheindlin of the U.S District Court of the Southern District of New York ruled on a motion for summary judgment that Skowron must forfeit $31 million—100% of the compensation he earned from the firm between 2007 and 2010—to his employer, Morgan Stanley. The judge applied the legal doctrine of "faithless servant" to require Skowron to return his ill-gotten gains from the use of inside information to his employer, because he had engaged in insider trading, in violation of the firm's code of ethics, and failed to report his insider trading to the company. The judge said that insider trading was "the ultimate abuse of a portfolio manager's position." She noted further: "In addition to exposing Morgan Stanley to government investigations to and direct financial losses, Skowron's behavior damaged the firm's reputation, a valuable corporate asset".
