= Legal hold =

Process used by organizations to ensure the integrity of information during a legal issue

A legal hold is a process that an organization uses to preserve all forms of potentially relevant information when litigation is pending or reasonably anticipated. It is often issued when an organization receives a request for production in pending litigation.

The legal hold is initiated by a notice or communication from legal counsel to an organization that suspends the normal disposition or processing of records, such as backup tape recycling, archived media and other storage and management of documents and information. A legal hold will be issued as a result of current or anticipated litigation, audit, government investigation or other such matter to avoid evidence spoliation. Legal holds can encompass business procedures affecting active data, including backup tape recycling. Recent amendments to the United States Federal Rules of Civil Procedure (FRCP) address the discovery of electronically stored information (ESI) (a.k.a. e-discovery), expanding the use of a "legal hold" beyond preservation of paper documents. The amendments were written in anticipation of legal arguments and tactics related to the production of ESI, such as the cost and difficulty of producing such ESI and claims that such ESI was missing, deleted, or otherwise inaccessible when it really wasn’t the case. These changes took effect December 1, 2006 and require organizations to hold all electronic records until each legal matter is formally settled, even if an organization only reasonably anticipates litigation.

== See also ==
- Electronic discovery
- Electronically stored information
- Records management
- Spoliation of evidence
