= Portfolio manager =

Financial professional

A portfolio manager (PM) is a professional responsible for making investment decisions and carrying out investment activities on behalf of vested individuals or institutions. Clients invest their money for future growth, such as a retirement fund, endowment fund, or education fund. PMs work with a team of analysts and researchers and are responsible for establishing an investment strategy, selecting appropriate investments, and allocating each investment properly towards an investment fund or asset management vehicle.

== Model ==
Modern portfolio theory suggests a diversified portfolio of shares and other asset classes (such as debt in corporate bonds, treasury bonds, or money market funds) will realise more predictable returns if there is prudent market regulation.

In the 1950s, Harry Markowitz, an American economist, developed the modern portfolio theory. Jack Treynor (1961, 1962), William F. Sharpe (1964), John Lintner (1965) and Jan Mossin (1966) later build the Capital Asset Pricing Model (CAPM) on the theory of Markowitz. Nowadays, the CAPM is one of the primary portfolio management tools. The formula calculates the potential return percentage of an investment vehicle based on its vested risk appetite. The formula is:

$\mu_i = r_f + (\mu_M - r_f)*\beta_i$

where:

- $\mu_i =$ expected returns
- $r_f =$ risk free rate
- $\mu_M =$ expected market returns
- $\beta_i =$ risk measure

== Investors ==
The goal of an investment manager is to earn a greater return than the return expected given the level of risk. This return can be monitored by investors through weekly, monthly, quarterly, or yearly performance reports that are shared by the PM. The manager may set up a performance benchmark or track their investment strategy alongside an index. The investment policy shared by the manager outlines investment details, such as minimum investment requirements, liquidity provisions, investment strategy, and the markets the manager will be actively investing in.

Institutional investors include fund of hedge funds, insurance companies, endowment funds, and sovereign wealth funds. Individual investors include ultra-high net worth individuals (UHNW) or high net worth individuals (HNW).

== Portfolio managers and investment analysts ==
Portfolio managers make decisions about investment mix and policy, matching investments to objectives, asset allocation for individuals and institutions, and balancing risk against performance. Portfolio management is about strengths, weaknesses, opportunities, and threats in the choice of debt vs. equity, domestic vs. international, growth vs. safety, and other trade-offs encountered in the attempt to maximize return at a given appetite for risk.

Portfolio managers are presented with investment ideas by internal buy-side analysts and sell-side analysts from investment banks. It is their job to sift through the relevant information and use their judgment to buy and sell securities. Throughout the day they read reports, talk to company managers, and monitor industry and economic trends, looking for the right company and time to invest the portfolio's capital.

A team of analysts and researchers is ultimately responsible for establishing an investment strategy, selecting appropriate investments, and allocating each investment properly for a fund or asset management vehicle.

In the case of mutual and exchange-traded funds (ETFs), there are two forms of portfolio management: passive and active. Passive management simply tracks a market index, commonly referred to as indexing or index investing. Active management involves a single manager, co-managers, or a team of managers who attempt to beat the market return by actively managing a fund's portfolio through investment decisions based on research and decisions on individual holdings. Closed-end funds are generally actively managed.

=== Insider trading ===
A portfolio manager risks losing his past compensation if he engages in insider trading; in fact, lawyers at the law firm Davis & Gilbert wrote in an article in a 2014 article in Financial Fraud Law Report that:

"Based upon courts current application of New York's faithless servant doctrine, it is virtually certain that if ... hedge fund ... managers engage in wrongdoing ... those .. managers will be forced to disgorge all compensation received during the period the wrongdoing occurred".

In Morgan Stanley v. Skowron, 989 F. Supp. 2d 356 (S.D.N.Y. 2013), applying New York's faithless servant doctrine, the court held that a hedge fund's PM engaging in insider trading in violation of his company's code of conduct, which also required him to report his misconduct, must repay his employer the full $31 million his employer paid him as compensation during his period of faithlessness. The court called the insider trading the "ultimate abuse of a PM's position." The judge also wrote: ""In addition to exposing Morgan Stanley to government investigations and direct financial losses, Skowron's behavior damaged the firm's reputation, a valuable corporate asset."

== Systems ==
The IT infrastructure for a PM facilitates the delivery of updated prices and market information to allow for trade orders, trade executions, and their overall portfolio value. The IT infrastructure, known as a portfolio management system (PMS), include components such as an order management system, execution management system, portfolio valuation, risk, and compliance. A front-back PMS will also include a middle office and back office components such as trade management, pre/post-trade tools, cash management, and net asset value calculations.

== See also ==
- Outline of finance § Portfolio theory
