= Electronically stored information =

Electronically stored information (ESI), for the purpose of the Federal Rules of Civil Procedure (FRCP) is information created, manipulated, communicated, stored, and best utilized in digital form, requiring the use of computer hardware and software.

ESI has become a legally defined phrase as the U.S. government determined for the purposes of the FRCP rules of 2006 that promulgating procedures for maintenance and discovery for electronically stored information was necessary. References to “electronically stored information” in the Federal Rules of Civil Procedure (FRCP) invoke an expansive approach to what may be discovered during the fact-finding stage of civil litigation.

Rule 34(a) enables a party in a civil lawsuit to request another party to produce and permit the requesting party or its representative to inspect, copy, test, or sample the following items in the responding party's possession, custody, or control:

any designated documents or electronically stored information—including writings, drawings, graphs, charts, photographs, sound recordings, images, and other data or data compilations—stored in any medium from which information can be obtained either directly or, if necessary, after translation by the responding party into a reasonably usable form...Rule 34(a)(1) is intended to be broad enough to cover all current types of computer-based information, and flexible enough to encompass future changes and developments.

== Types ==
=== Native files ===
The term native files refers to user-created documents, which could be in Microsoft Office or OpenDocument file formats as well as other files stored on computer, but could include video surveillance footage saved on a computer hard drive, computer-aided design files such as blueprints or maps, digital photographs, scanned images, archive files, e-mail, and digital audio files, among other data.

=== Logical data ===
A judge ruled that RAM is reasonably accessible and retainable for anticipation of litigation.

Since 1996, Australia has permitted RAM to be used in litigation.

== See also ==
- Sedona Canada Principles
