= FreeUndelete =

Data recovery software utility

- FreeUndelete 2.1 on Windows 7
- Developer(s): Recoveronix Ltd.
- Initial release: December 7, 2004; 20 years ago
- Stable release: 2.1.36867.1 / December 1, 2011; 13 years ago
- Operating system: Microsoft Windows
- Size: 939 KB
- Type: Data recovery
- License: Freemium
- Website: www.officerecovery.com/freeundelete/

FreeUndelete is a freeware data recovery software utility, running under Microsoft Windows 7, Vista, XP, 2003 and 2000. FreeUndelete supports NTFS and FAT file systems.

The program allows users to recover files that have been permanently deleted from Windows Recycle Bin. It can work with a variety of fixed and removable media, typically hard drives. FreeUndelete has been successfully used to recover digital photos from SD cards.

FreeUndelete takes advantage of the fact that file deletion is just a minor state change in the system file index. It finds the area(s) where the file contents are located on the disk, then re-creates the index entry to undelete the file.

== See also ==
- Undeletion
- File deletion
- Data recovery
