= Disk Drill =

Data recovery utility by Cleverfiles

- Developer: CleverFiles
- Stable release: 6.0 (Mac), 6.0 (Windows)
- Operating system: macOS and Windows
- Type: Data recovery
- License: Free (up to 500MB)
- Website: cleverfiles.com

Disk Drill is a data recovery utility for Windows and macOS developed by Cleverfiles. It was introduced in 2010, and is primarily designed to recover deleted or lost files from hard disk drives, USB flash drives and SSD drives with the help of Recovery Vault technology. While Disk Drill was originally exclusive to the Mac, a Windows version was released in 2015.

== Recovery Vault ==
The core of Disk Drill is a Recovery Vault technology which allows to recover data from a medium that was secured by Recovery Vault beforehand. Recovery Vault runs as a background service and remembers all metadata and properties of the deleted data, making it possible to restore deleted files with their original file names and location.

== Supported file systems ==
The macOS version of Disk Drill supports data recovery from a variety of file systems, including:

- HFS – Hierarchical File System, used by older versions of macOS.
- HFS+ - default file system up to macOS Sierra.
- FAT – File Allocation Table, commonly used on USB flash drives and external drives.
- APFS - Apple File System, default file system in macOS High Sierra and later.

== Data backup ==
Disk Drill can be also used as a backup utility for creating copies of the disk or partition in DMG images format.

== Version for Windows ==
In February 2015, CleverFiles launched a Windows version of its data recovery software. While in beta, Disk Drill for Windows was licensed as freeware. It allows the recovery of deleted files from storage devices that can be accessed from Windows PC. Disk Drill for Windows also includes the Recovery Vault technology and works on any Windows XP system or newer (Windows Vista, 7, 8, 10). The software is compatible with FAT and NTFS, as well as HFS+ and ext2/3/4 file systems.

In September 2016, CleverFiles announced the availability of Disk Drill 2 for Windows, the new version of the expert-level data recovery app.

== Release history ==
| Version | Platform | Release date | Notes and significant changes |
|---|---|---|---|
| 1.0.47 Beta | Macintosh | September 2010 | First Beta. |
| 1.0.52 Beta | Macintosh | September 2010 | The first public release |
| 1.0.62 | Macintosh | November 2010 | In-app navigation.; New uninstaller.; Better support of the disks used for Time Machine backups |
| 1.1 | Macintosh | February 2011 | Totally new Deep Scan algorithm; Recovery and scanning sessions management; S.M.A.R.T. disk diagnostics added; Portable Mode introduced; Interactive scanning and recovery dialogs |
| 1.4 | Macintosh | August 2011 | Guaranteed Recovery algorithm introduced |
| 1.7 | Macintosh | February 2012 | Thunderbolt support; Full support of new Growl's features |
| 1.8 | Macintosh | May 2012 | New file signatures were added to Deep Scan's database; The speed of Quick Scan was significantly improved; Integration with OS X Mountain Lion Notification Center |
| 2.0 | Macintosh | May 2013 | Completely Redesigned UI; HFS+ Catalog file rebuild function; Universal Partition Search function; Scan for Lost HFS+ Partition method; Mount Scanning Results As Disk function; Better Deep Scan file naming |
| 2.1 | Macintosh | December 2013 | updated Directory Rebuild recovery algorithm; additional disk image formats can now be attached in Disk Drill: .raw, .dd and .img; extended disk health monitoring for I/O errors; new file signatures: EMF (Enhanced Windows Metafile), LNK (MS Windows Link), DPX (Cineon image file); 64-bit ready internal daemon (responsible for Recovery Vault, S.M.A.R.T. stats and Guaranteed Recovery) |
| 2.2 | Macintosh | March 2014 | More file type signatures added to Deep Scan; Completely redesigned HFS+ Catalog File Rebuild recovery algorithm |
| 2.3 | Macintosh | August 2014 | More file type signatures added to Deep Scan; Disk Drill interface is retina-ready; New drive blocks reading indication; Support of ExFAT within Deep Scan |
| 2.4 | Macintosh | August 2014 | New disk space visualization module; Recoverable files can now be previewed with hex view; Mounted disks and disk images can now be ejected right from Disk Drill; “Allocate Existing File System Data” scan method is now available for free in Disk Drill Basic; Support the recovery of stereo images in MPO format |
| 2.4.437 | Macintosh | December 2015 | Deep Scan: DNG (Adobe Lightroom Raw images) recovery with Deep Scan; Damaged drives: bad sectors management improvements; File systems: Quick Scan internal procedures updated; Internal: software protection and activation improved; Fixed: occasional exceptions on Mac OS X 10.6.8 |
| 1.0 | Windows | February 2015 | Disk Drill version for Windows released |
| 1.0.188 | Windows | June 2015 | new: multi-format byte-to-byte disk backups (ISO, IMG); improved: search in found items after scanning for recoverable data; improved: smoother scrolling in scanning results; improved: disks and partitions visibility status in the main screen; improved: FAT and NTFS systems low-level reading |
| 2.0.253 | Windows | August 2016 | Completely free data recovery up to 2GB; ExFAT, ext4 support; New file signature for Deep Scan; Faster byte-to-byte disk backups; Improved standard preview of found files; UI improvements; Fixes and improvements in Windows 10.x |
| 3.0.756 | Macintosh | September 2016 | iOS data recovery for iPhone and iPad; Android recovery; Bootable disk creation for data recovery; Improved preview; Totally new UI; Support of macOS Sierra 10.12; Extra features: duplicate file finder module, faster byte-to-byte disk backups and much more |
| 4.0.0 | Windows | August 2019 | Improved data protection; New image file formats; File labeling added; Expanded Disk Image support; BitLocker support; New UI; Improved file previewing module |
| 4.0.123 | macOS | October 2020 | macOS Big Sur support; iOS 14 support; Updated FAT32, NTFS, HFS+, and APFS recovery algorithms; Data extraction from devices with the T2 encryption chip; RAW file formats recovery; New UI with a Dark Mode supported; Free Data Shredder feature |
| 5.0.732 | Windows | November 2022 | Cutting-edge smooth modular user interface; Recover already found files even before completing your scans; Up to 8x faster scanning for lost data; RAID recovery – scan and undelete data from Windows and Linux software RAID arrays; VHD and VHDX support; Multiple new image formats can be reconstructed and properly labeled by Deep Scan.; Deep Scan masters more video formats; Google Pixel Motion Photos recovery; A great variety of professional file formats added to Disk Drill’s Deep Scan and labeling algorithms; New file generation rules in Deep Scan for multiple file signatures; Disk Drill quick start added to the right-click menu of the [Recycle Bin; Introducing adaptive Dark Mode.; Introducing more ways to manage, filter, group and sort through the found data; Entire disk scans may now produce additional recoverable file trees under the new “Lost data structures” group in the scanning results; More informative scanning progress indicator; Better naming of located lost partitions with their original volume titles (when recoverable); Disk backup creation can now be paused and resumed; Search history for scan results; Scanning sessions are now cross-platform.; S.M.A.R.T. module – keyboard navigation and clipboard integration |
| 5.0.1043 | macOS | November 2022 | Cutting-edge smooth modular user interface; Fully compatible with macOS Ventura (version 13); Scan and recover lost data from iPhones and iPads running iOS 16/16.1, iOS backups and iPadOS included; Predict recovery chances before the actual recovery; Fully compatible with Apple computers powered by the new M2 chip; RAID recovery – scan and undelete data from Windows and Linux software RAID arrays; VHD and VHDX support; Multiple new image formats can be reconstructed and properly labeled by Deep Scan; Deep Scan masters more video formats; Google Pixel Motion Photos recovery; A great variety of professional file formats added to Disk Drill’s Deep Scan and labeling algorithms; New file generation rules in Deep Scan for multiple file signatures; Deep Scan in Disk Drill for Mac is catching up with its Windows sibling; Introducing more ways to manage, filter, group and sort through the found data; Entire disk scans may now produce additional recoverable file trees under the new “Lost data structures” group in the scanning results; More informative scanning progress indicator; Search history for scan results; macOS Installer creation module now offers the downloading of older versions of macOS/Mac OS X; Scanning sessions are now cross-platform.; S.M.A.R.T. module – keyboard navigation and clipboard integration |
| 6.0 | Windows, macOS | June 2025 | Advanced Camera Recovery – reconstruct truly fragmented videos from GoPro, DJI, Canon, Panasonic, Insta360, Sony, Olympus and more; Next-gen Byte-to-Byte Backups – 60% more successful backups with fault-tolerance and advanced damaged drive handling; Faster scans – up to 25% speed increase and up to 20% more data recovered from corrupted partitions; Expanded format support – NEV (Nikon N-RAW) plus 100+ updated signatures in Deep Scan; ReFS lost partition recovery – enterprise-grade support for Microsoft’s Resilient File System; BitLocker recovery on macOS – restore encrypted Windows partitions directly from Mac; APFS recovery on Windows – cross-platform support for Apple-formatted drives |

== See also ==
- Data recovery
- Data remanence
- File deletion
- List of data recovery software
- Undeletion
