= Erased =

Erased may refer to:

- "Erased", a 2002 song by Paradise Lost from Symbol of Life
- "Erased", a 2005 song by Trust Company from True Parallels
- "Erased", a 2009 song by Dead by April from Dead by April
- "Erased", a 2014 song by Volumes from No Sleep
- "Erased", a 2018 song by Cane Hill from Too Far Gone
- "Erased", a 2026 song by Sylosis from The New Flesh
- Erased (manga), a 2012 Japanese manga series by Kei Sanbe
  - Erased (2016 film), a Japanese live-action film based on the manga
- Erased (2012 film), an action-thriller film directed by Philipp Stölzl
- Erased (2018 film), a Slovenian drama film directed by Miha Mazzini
- Erased (heraldry), a blazonry term
- The Erased, a term for people in Slovenia without legal citizenship status

== See also ==
- Erase (disambiguation)
- Eraser (disambiguation)
- Erasure (disambiguation)
