= Windows File Recovery =

Software utility from Microsoft to recover deleted files

- Other names: winfr
- Developer: Microsoft
- Operating system: Microsoft Windows
- Type: Command
- License: Proprietary commercial software
- Website: Official website

Windows File Recovery is a command-line software utility from Microsoft to recover deleted files. It is freely available for Windows 10 version 2004 (May 2020 Update) and later from the Microsoft Store.

Windows File Recovery can recover files from a local hard disk drive (HDD), USB flash drive, or memory card such as an SD card. It can work to some extent with solid-state drives (SSD).

The program is run using the winfr command. It has a mode designed for NTFS file systems, that will attempt recovery of files from a disk that is corrupted or has been formatted. Another mode will attempt recovery of specific file types from FAT and exFAT (predominantly found on external devices) and ReFS file systems.

== See also ==
- Data remanence
- Data recovery
- List of data recovery software
- File History
- Trash (computing)
- Undeletion
