= Recovery Toolbox =

Microsoft windows recovery software

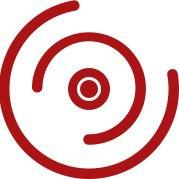
- Developer: Recovery Toolbox Inc.
- Initial release: 2003
- Operating system: Microsoft Windows
- Platform: x86/x64
- Type: Data recovery
- License: Freeware/Shareware
- Website: recoverytoolbox.com

Recovery Toolbox is a family of tools and online services for recovering corrupted files, file formats, and recovering passwords for various programs.

== History ==
Recovery Toolbox was created by Recovery Toolbox, Inc., which has developed software for repairing damaged files since 2003.

== Components ==
The Recovery Toolbox family includes both installable software and web services.

=== Installable software ===
Freeware recovery tools include:

- Recovery Toolbox for CD Free for repairing data from compact discs, including HD DVD and Blu-ray, affected by system errors or physically damaged (scratched, exposed to liquids, etc.).
- Recovery Toolbox File Undelete for recovering of deleted files on HDD with support for NTFS file system (Windows), though it doesn’t work with SSD storage.

Some Recovery Toolbox tools are provided as shareware:

- Recovery Toolbox for Flash “undeletes” files from various storage media with FAT file systems: SD, CF, MMC, and other memory cards, smart media cards, IBM MicroDrives, Flash and USB drives, digital cameras, and floppy disks.
- Recovery Toolbox for RAR repairs damaged RAR archives, including all formats and compression rates, password-protected archives, and archives stored on corrupted media.
- Recovery Toolbox for Excel repairs corrupted Microsoft Excel files while preserving most tabular data, styles, fonts, sheets, formulas, functions, cell colors, borders, etc.
- Recovery Toolbox for Outlook repairs data from corrupted Microsoft Outlook's PST and OST files, including emails, contacts, reminders, meetings, tasks, notes, calendar entries, logs, etc.

=== Web services ===
Recovery Toolbox web services allow repairing the following file formats:

- Adobe file formats: PDF documents and presentations ((Adobe Acrobat/PDF Reader), AI image files (Adobe Illustrator), and PSD project files (Adobe Photoshop)
- Microsoft Office file formats: Excel spreadsheets, Word documents (including RTF), PowerPoint presentations, and Project files; email formats: PST and OST (Outlook), and DBX (Outlook Express
- Other image file formats: DWG (AutoCAD) and CDR (CorelDraw)
- Database formats: ACCDB and MDB (Access, DBF (FoxPro/Clipper/dBase, etc.)

== About the Developer ==
Recovery Toolbox, Inc. is an IT company that has been developing software for repairing corrupted files since 2003. To date, they have developed solutions to repair corrupted files of over 30 different types, including extensions created with Microsoft Office software (such as Outlook and Excel) and data stored on various media (hard drives, portable devices, CDs/DVDs, etc.).

== See also ==
- GetDataBack
- Recover My Files
