= Recuva =

Undeletion program for Windows

- Recuva 1.28 on Windows Vista
- Developer: Piriform Software
- Release: August 7, 2007; 19 years ago
- Stable release: 1.55.133 (June 19, 2026)
- Operating system: Windows 10, 8.1, 8, 7, Vista and XP. Including both 32-bit and 64-bit versions, but not RT tablet editions.
- Size: 4.2 MB
- Available in: 30+ languages
- Type: Undeletion
- License: Freemium
- Website: www.ccleaner.com/recuva

Recuva (/rɪˈkʌvə/) is an undeletion program for Windows, developed by Piriform Software.

It is able to undelete files that have been marked as deleted; the operating system marks the areas of the disk in which they were stored as free space. Recuva can recover files deleted from internal and external hard disk drives, USB flash drives, memory cards, portable media players or all random-access storage mediums with a supported file system. The program works on FAT, exFAT and NTFS file systems of Windows, and as of version 1.5.3 it can also recover files from Ext2, Ext3 and Ext4 file systems of Linux. It is able to recover lost directory structure and automatically renames files when trying to recover two files of the same name. As with other file recovery programs Recuva works by looking for unreferenced data, but if the operating system has written new data over a deleted file then recovery will often not be possible.

Preview thumbnails of intact photos can be displayed in grid view mode and in the side bar.

Recuva was described by vnunet.com as an "effective tool for undeleting or salvaging files we sent for recycling and deleted, in the past".

== See also ==
- List of data recovery software
- CCleaner – Suite of utilities for cleaning disk and operating system environment
- Data remanence – Data that remains after deleting it
