= Deletion =

Deletion or delete may refer to:

== Arts and entertainment ==
=== Music ===
- Deletion (music industry), removal from a label's catalog
- "Delete" (Dara Bubamara song), 2012
- "Delete" (DMA's song), 2014
- "Delete" (Story Untold song), 2017
- "Delete" (Sid song), 2020
- "Deletion", a song by Hans Zimmer from Dark Phoenix (soundtrack), 2019
- "Delete", a song by Capsule from Caps Lock, 2013
- "Delete", a song by Killing Joke from Pylon, 2015
- "Delete", a song by Shinedown from Planet Zero, 2022
- "Delete", a song by Younha from Gobaek Ha Gi Joheun Nal, 2007
- "Deleted", a song by Tech N9ne and MacKenzie Nicole from The Storm, 2016

=== Film and television ===
- Delete (miniseries), a 2013 TV miniseries
- Deleted (film), a 2022 Singaporean-Malaysian film

== Computing ==
- File deletion, removal of a file from a computer's file system
- Delete key, a button on computer keyboards
- Delete character, the delete control code in ASCII
- delete (C++), in the C++ programming language

== Other uses ==
- Deletion (genetics), a mutation where part of a chromosome is left out during DNA replication
- Elision or deletion in linguistics, the omission of one or more sounds in a word
- Ellipsis (linguistics), the omission from a clause of one or more words

== See also ==
- Erasure (disambiguation)
- Erase (disambiguation)
- Code cleanup, writing code so that it cleans up leftover and other unwanted materials
