= Optimistic decompression =

Optimistic decompression is a digital forensics technique in which each byte of an input buffer is examined for the possibility of compressed data. If data is found that might be compressed, a decompression algorithm is invoked to perform a trial decompression. If the decompressor does not produce an error, the decompressed data is processed. The decompressor is thus called optimistically---that is, with the hope that it might be successful.

Optimistic decompression is used as a tool to validate JPEGs that are produced by file carving. The approach can also be used for fragment reassembly carving by attempting to combine different combinations of fragments, looking for a combination that produces neither decompression errors nor visual discontinuities.
