= Paloma Negra (novel) =

2012 novel by Miha Mazzini

- Author: Miha Mazzini
- Original title: Paloma negra
- Translator: Maja Visenjak Limon
- Language: English
- Genre: Novel
- Publisher: Open Books
- Publication date: 2012
- English publication date: 2014
- Media type: Print, paperback & E-book
- Pages: 280 pp
- ISBN: 0692253653
- Preceded by: German Lottery

Paloma Negra is a novel by Miha Mazzini. It was first published in Slovenia in 2012.

== Plot ==
The novel is set in Yugoslavia in 1950 under the communist regime. David is an officer who doesn't want to sign killing order for the political prisoners and he is exiled in a small village high in the mountains where rules of its own apply, set up by Michael, head of local band of smugglers. The travelling cinema comes to the village and after one singing Mexican melodrama, younger villagers start to dress like Mexicans and form a musical band. David is amused but the everything soon goes out of hand and David's superiors are coming to see how he is maintaining order in the village.

== Translations ==
- Slovenian edition was published in 2012 by Beletrina.
- English edition was published in 2014 by Open books.
- Bosnian edition published in 2024 by Connectum.
