= Cleanup =

Cleanup, clean up or clean-up may refer to:

- Cleanup (animation), a stage of animation workflow
- Clean-up (environment), environmental action to remove litter from a place
- Cleanup hitter, a baseball position
- Clean-up Records, a record label imprint
- Code cleanup, an aspect of computer programming
- Operation Clean-up, Pakistani military intelligence operation

== See also ==
- Cleaning
- Environmental remediation
