= TestDisk =

Data recovery utility

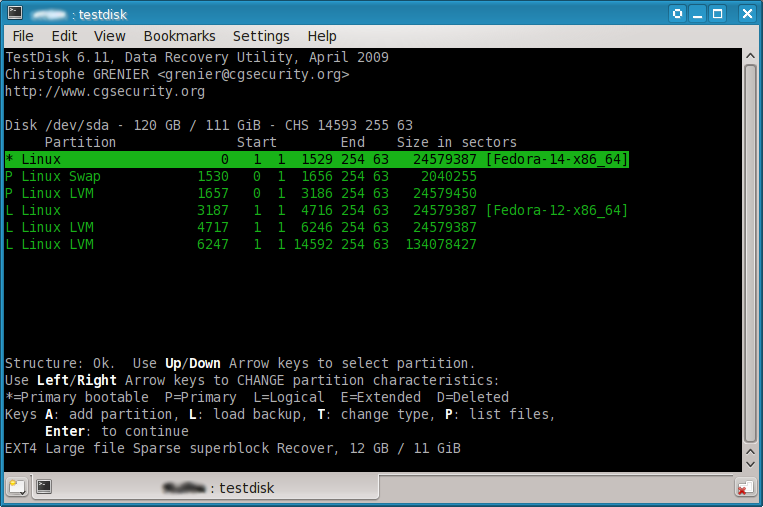
- Developer: Christophe Grenier
- Stable release: 7.2 / February 22, 2024
- Written in: C
- Type: Data recovery
- License: GPL
- Website: www.cgsecurity.org/wiki/TestDisk
- Repository: git.cgsecurity.org/cgit/testdisk/

TestDisk is a free and open-source data recovery utility that helps users recover lost partitions or repair corrupted filesystems. TestDisk can collect detailed information about a corrupted drive, which can then be sent to a technician for further analysis. TestDisk supports MS-DOS, Windows, Linux, FreeBSD, NetBSD, OpenBSD, SunOS, and MacOS. TestDisk handles non-partitioned and partitioned media. In particular, it recognizes the GUID Partition Table (GPT), Apple partition map, PC/Intel BIOS partition tables, Sun Solaris slice and Xbox fixed partitioning scheme. TestDisk uses a command line user interface. In one test TestDisk recovered deleted files with 97% accuracy.

== Features ==
TestDisk can recover deleted partitions, rebuild partition tables or rewrite the master boot record (MBR). EFI GPT is also supported.

=== Partition recovery ===
TestDisk retrieves the LBA size and CHS geometry of attached data storage devices (i.e. hard disks, memory cards, USB flash drives, and virtual disk images) from the BIOS or the operating system. The geometry information is required for a successful recovery. TestDisk reads sectors on the storage device to determine if the partition table or filesystem on it requires repair (see next section).

TestDisk is able to recognize the following partition table formats:

- Apple partition map
- GUID Partition Table
- Humax
- PC/Intel Partition Table (master boot record)
- Sun Solaris slice
- Xbox fixed partitioning scheme
- Non-partitioned media

TestDisk can perform deeper checks to locate partitions that have been deleted from the partition table. However, it is up to the user to look over the list of possible partitions found by TestDisk and to select those that they wish to recover.

After partitions are located, TestDisk can rebuild the partition table and rewrite the MBR.

=== Filesystem repair ===
TestDisk can deal with some specific logical filesystem corruption.

=== File recovery ===
When a file is deleted, the list of disk clusters occupied by the file is erased, marking those sectors available for use by other files created or modified thereafter. TestDisk can recover deleted files especially if the file was not fragmented and the clusters have not been reused.

There are two file recovery mechanisms in the TestDisk package:

- TestDisk proper uses knowledge of the filesystem structure to perform "undelete".
- PhotoRec is a "file carver". It does not need any knowledge of the file system, but instead looks for patterns of known file formats in the partition or disk image. It works best on unfragmented files and cannot recover the file name.

== Digital forensics ==
TestDisk can be used in digital forensics to retrieve partitions that were deleted long ago. It can mount various types of disk images including the Expert Witness File Format used by EnCase. Binary disk images, such as those created with ddrescue, can be read by TestDisk as though they were storage devices.

In TestDisk versions prior to version 7, a malformed disk or its image can be used to inject malicious code into a running TestDisk application on Cygwin.

== File system support ==
File system support for TestDisk is shown in the table:

Name	Partition Recovery	Filesystem Recovery		File Recovery
Name	Find filesystem	Boot sector/ superblock Restore	File table repair	Undelete
FAT12/16/32	Yes	Yes (Note: Find filesystem parameters to rewrite a valid BIOS parameter block (analogous to "superblocks" in Unix file systems)) (Note: Restore the BPB using its backup (NTFS, FAT32, exFAT))	Yes (Note: Use the two copies of the FAT to rewrite a coherent version)	Yes
exFAT	Yes	Yes	Use fsck	Yes
NTFS	Yes	Yes	Yes (Note: Restore the Master File Table (MFT) from its backup)	Yes
ext2, ext3, and ext4	Yes	Yes (Note: Find backup superblock location to assist fsck)	Use fsck	Yes
HFS, HFS+, HFSX	Yes	Yes	Use fsck	No
ReFS	No	No	No	No
APFS	No	No	No	No
BeOS	Yes	No		No
BSD disklabel (FreeBSD/OpenBSD/NetBSD)	Yes	No		No
Cramfs	Yes	No		No
IBM JFS2	Yes	No		No
Linux RAID (mdadm) (Note: RAID 1: mirroring, RAID 4: striped array with parity device, RAID 5: striped array with distributed parity information and RAID 6: striped array with distributed dual redundancy information)	Yes	No		No
Linux Swap 1 and 2	Yes	No		No
LVM and LVM2	Yes	No		No
Novell Storage Services (NSS)	Yes	No		No
ReiserFS 3.5, 3.6 and 4	Yes	No		No
Sun Solaris i386 disklabel	Yes	No		No
UFS and UFS2 (Sun/BSD/…)	Yes	No		No
XFS from SGI	Yes	No		No

Some features, such as partition table editing and PhotoRec "carving", do not depend on the file system at all.

== See also ==
- PhotoRec
- List of data recovery software
- List of free and open-source software packages
