= DMDE =

Data recovery software

DMDE (DM Disk Editor and Data Recovery Software)
- Original author: Dmitry Sidorov
- Stable release: 4.4.4.842 / February 5, 2026; 9 months ago
- Operating system: Cross-platform software
- Type: Data recovery
- License: Shareware
- Website: dmde.com

DMDE (DM Disk Editor and Data Recovery Software) is a data recovery and disk editing tool for hard drives and other storage media. It can work with physical devices, logical disks, disk images, as well as RAID-arrays and recovers files that have been accidentally deleted or lost due to other incidents.

== Overview ==
DMDE is available in various editions. Free Edition (freeware) of DMDE is intended for personal use only, and allows only recovery of files located in the currently selected directory. Additionally, it allows restoring files from a single folder in batches of 4,000 or less, however there's no limit on how many files can be recovered in total. DMDE paid options don't have these limitations and suggest additional features. Various reviews note that the application stands out for its attractive price, while the free option can also be sufficient in many scenarios.

DMDE is ranked among the best data recovery software and reviewed on popular technology websites, such as TechRadar, Forbes Advisor, Softpedia. In reviews it is noted that the application does not have the simplest and most attractive interface, but it is effective, especially in complex cases.

The program is able to recover files after deletion from the recycle bin, after formatting or other disk damages including complicated cases. DMDE can create and later open disk images to perform recovery without the risk of further damage to the drive itself. Other advanced features of DMDE include raw data search, direct disk editing capability, RAID reconstruction module, disk cloning, and partition manager.

Version are available for Windows, MacOS, Linux, and MS-DOS. Supported file systems include:

- Windows: FAT12, FAT16, FAT32, exFAT, NTFS, NTFS5, ReFS;
- Mac OS: HFS/HFS Plus, HFSX, APFS;
- Linux: ext2, ext3, ext4, Btrfs.

== See also ==
- List of data recovery software
