= Deleted programs =

Deleted programs may refer to:

- File deletion
- Category:Lost television shows – many early television programs were either wiped or destroyed or never recorded in the first place

== See also ==
- Wiping, the practice of erasing videotapes for reuse
- Deleted scene
