= Mac Data Recovery Guru =

- Developer(s): Mac OS X File Recovery
- Stable release: 2.5
- Operating system: macOS
- Type: Data recovery
- License: Trialware
- Website: macosxfilerecovery.com

Mac Data Recovery Guru is a data recovery application, for macOS. It was designed to recover deleted files from hard disk drives, USB flash drives, memory cards of cameras and portable devices, MP3 players, PlayStations, X-Boxes, Wii's, palm devices and optical media.

== Embedded file recovery ==
Mac Data Recovery Guru has a “Search for embedded files” option that will make it do an exhaustive search for every file type it can recover starting from every byte on the drive, instead just searching for files starting at a block boundary. This is for use by digital forensics professionals.

== Supported file systems ==
macOS: HFS, HFS+, HFSX

Microsoft: NTFS, FAT

Linux: Ext2, Ext3, Ext4, XFS, UFS

== See also ==
- Data recovery
- File deletion
- List of data recovery software
