= Collector of Names =

1993 novel by Miha Mazzini

The Collector of Names
- First English edition
- Author: Miha Mazzini
- Original title: Zbiralec imen
- Translator: Maja Visenjak Limon
- Language: English
- Genre: Novel
- Set in: Mediterranean Sea
- Publisher: Severed Press
- Publication date: 1993
- Publication place: Slovenia
- English publication date: 2009
- Media type: Print (paperback), ebook
- Pages: 218 pp
- ISBN: 9780980606539 (1st English ed)
- OCLC: 781000257
- Preceded by: King of the Rattling Spirits
- Followed by: German Lottery

The Collector of Names is a horror novel by Miha Mazzini. It was first published in Slovenia in 1993 and it was finalist of the Vladimir Slejko Prize for best novel of the year.

== Plot ==
The story is set on a small island in the Mediterranean Sea. Students are coming to party, local pensioners are having their own fun, and suddenly there is a child among them asking them for their names. The person who actually answers him, giving away his name and identity, sinks into personal annihilation.
