= The Cartier Project =

1987 novel by Miha Mazzini

Crumbs
- Second edition
- Author: Miha Mazzini
- Original title: Drobtinice
- Translator: Maja Visenjak Limon
- Language: English
- Publisher: Freight Books
- Publication date: 1987
- Publication place: Slovenia
- English publication date: 2014
- Media type: Print (Paperback & E-book)
- Pages: 256 pp.
- ISBN: 978-1908754394
- Followed by: Guarding Hanna

The Cartier Project is a novel by Miha Mazzini. It was first published in Slovenia (then still part of Yugoslavia) in 1987 under the title of Drobtinice ("Crumbs"). It sold 54000 copies and won "the best Slovenian novel of the year" award and "Zlata ptica" award for excellent artistic achievement by a young writer, 1988.

== Story ==
The first person narrative follows Egon, a well-read, degenerate chancer living in a non-descript, poverty-ridden foundry town in what was then Yugoslavia (now presumably Slovenia given an allusion to the towns proximity to the Italian border). Most of the town’s residents work at the foundry, with some occupying the guarded dormitories there. Egon shuns this, instead spending his days bothering his friends and a string of lovers for food, beer, sex, and shelter, something he finds remarkably easy on account of his good looks and charm. He funds what he feels absolutely necessary through writing trashy romances under a pseudonym – whether he has higher literary ambitions is unclear. One of these necessities is a perfume he wears – Cartier pour l’homme. The novel opens with the realisation that he has run out. From there, Egon sets in motion a morally bankrupt plan that will recover him a new bottle. Meanwhile, a friend of his at the foundry is slowly losing his mind to an obsession with a film-star, and relationships Egon had always depended on are falling apart, only to be replaced by new & volatile ones. Over the course of the novel, Egon’s mental health issues and problems with self-identification begin to surface. The book’s final chapters are a mess of consequences, as grim as they are hilarious, and indicative of nation undergoing radical change

== Film ==
In 1991 TV Slovenia made a film based upon the novel - Cartier Project.

== Translations ==
First American edition was published in 2004 by Scala House press under the title The Cartier Project. Detroit Free Press selected it as one of the Top 10 Books of the Year 2005.

English edition was published in 2014 by Freight Books under the title Crumbs.
