= Erasure =

Erasure may refer to:

== Arts and media ==
- Erasure (duo), an English pop group
- Erasure (album), 1995, by the British group Erasure
- Erasure poetry, a form of found poetry created by erasing words from an existing text
- Erasure (novel), 2001, by Percival Everett

== Science and technology ==
- Data erasure, a method of software-based overwriting that completely destroys all electronic data
- Erasure channel, a communication channel model wherein errors are described as erasures
- Erasure code, a forward error correction (FEC) code for the binary erasure channel
- Type erasure, a process by which explicit type annotations are removed from a program
- Zeroisation, a process of erasing sensitive data stored electronically by overwriting it

== Other uses ==
- Erasure (heraldry), the removal of portions of charges in heraldry
- Social amnesia or social invisibility, the separation or systematic ignoring of a history or a group of people
  - Damnatio memoriae, Latin phrase meaning 'condemnation of memory'
  - LGBT erasure or queer erasure, the removal of evidence of LGBT groups or people and queerness
- Sous rature, or 'under erasure', a deconstructionist philosophical device developed by Heidegger and used by Derrida

== See also ==
- Erase (disambiguation)
- Erased (disambiguation)
- Eraser (disambiguation)
- Deletion (disambiguation)
