= Guarding Hanna =

2000 novel by Miha Mazzini

- Third edition
- Author: Miha Mazzini
- Original title: Telesni čuvaj
- Translator: Maja Visenjak Limon
- Language: English
- Publisher: North Atlantic Books
- Publication date: 2000
- Publication place: Slovenia
- English publication date: 2008
- Media type: Print (Paperback)
- Pages: 288 pp.
- ISBN: 978-1556437267
- Preceded by: Crumbs
- Followed by: King of the Rattling Spirits

Guarding Hanna is a novel by Miha Mazzini. First published in Slovenia in 2000 under the title of Telesni čuvaj (Body guard). Second Slovenian edition was published in 2004.

== Plot introduction ==
He was born a freak. With above-average intelligence, which soon realises that a body bent on destruction cannot live among others. The only person who can help him is a Mafia don, who has enough money to isolate the monster. But nothing comes free. And now, the moment when the freak has to repay the favour has arrived. He has to come out of isolation and become a bodyguard of a woman named Hanna for a week.

== Translations ==
First American edition was published in 2002 by Scala House press under the title Guarding Hanna.
Second American edition was published in 2008 by North Atlantic Books/Random House.
Serbian edition in 2008.
Polish edition in 2008.
Italian edition in 2011.
Turkish edition in 2015.

== Awards and nominations ==
Nominated for International Dublin Literary Award 2004.
