= German Lottery =

2010 novel by Miha Mazzini

German Lottery (novel)
- First edition
- Author: Miha Mazzini
- Original title: Nemška loterija
- Translator: Urška Zupanec
- Language: Slovenian
- Genre: Novel
- Publisher: Študentska založba
- Publication date: 2010
- English publication date: 2012
- Media type: Print, paperback
- Pages: 158 pp
- ISBN: 978-0-9567359-3-5
- Preceded by: Collector of Names
- Followed by: Paloma Negra (novel)

German Lottery is a novel by Miha Mazzini. It was first published in Slovenia in 2010, with a second edition in 2011, under the title of 'Nemška loterija'.

== Plot ==
The novel is set in Yugoslavia in 1950. The communist regime has quarreled with the Soviet Union while being under blockade from the West. The country is isolated, poor, government secret agents are everywhere and people are disappearing during the night.

The protagonist is a naive young man, 18 years old, a war orphan who wasn't accepted in the army because of his bad knee; he is disabled, so the authorities decide - with communist logic - that he should become a postman. He arrives in the town, into corrupt and dangerous world of double- (and triple-) crossing swindlers, armed only with his naive optimism. He will entangle himself into the deadly world of German Lottery, a unique charity where every ticket is free and everyone wins, where stakes are getting higher and higher, until one day somebody wins a jackpot …

== Translations ==
- English edition was published in 2012 by CB editions.
- German edition was published in 2016 by Transit Verlag.
