= 2004 Slovenian minority rights referendum =

4 April 2004
- Are you in favor of the law on the implementation of point 8 of the decision of the Constitutional Court of the Republic of Slovenia No. UI-246/02-28 (EPA 956-III), adopted by the National Assembly of the Republic of Slovenia on 25 November 2003?

Results
Choice	Votes	%
Yes	19,984	3.95%
No	485,356	96.05%
Valid votes	505,340	98.48%
Invalid or blank votes	7,794	1.52%
Total votes	513,134	100.00%
Registered voters/turnout	1,626,913	31.54%

A referendum on minority rights was held in Slovenia on 4 April 2004. Voters were asked whether they approved government proposals to restore basic rights to ethnic minorities who had been erased from the citizen registry in 1992. The proposal was rejected by 96% of voters, with a voter turnout of 32%.

The referendum was backed by oppositional Slovenian Democratic Party, while the government called for a boycott.

== Results ==
Choice	Votes	%
For	19,984	3.95
Against	485,356	96.05
Total	505,340	100.00
Valid votes	505,340	98.48
Invalid/blank votes	7,794	1.52
Total votes	513,134	100.00
Registered voters/turnout	1,626,913	31.54
Source: Državna volilna komisija RS
