= Miha Mazzini =

Slovenian writer

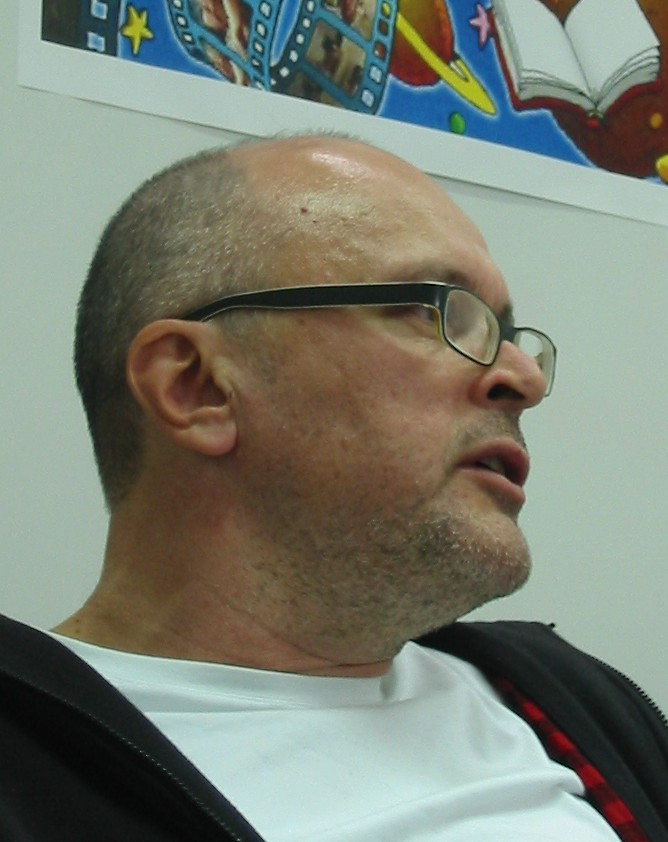
- Miha Mazzini
- Born: 3 June 1961 (age 65); Jesenice, PR Slovenia, Yugoslavia
- Education: University of Ljubljana, Ljubljana
- Occupations: Novelist, screenwriter, film director, columnist
- Writing career
- Period: 1981 to present
- Genres: Novel, Short story, Film
- Notable works: Guarding Hanna, The Cartier Project, King of the Rattling Spirits
- Website: www.mihamazzini.com

Miha Mazzini (born 3 June 1961) is a Slovenian writer, screenwriter and film director with thirty published books, translated in ten languages. He has a PhD in anthropology from the Institutum Studiorum Humanitatis and has MA in Creative Writing for Film and Television at the University of Sheffield. He is a voting member of the European Film Academy.

== Biography and works ==
Mazzini described his childhood in Titoist Yugoslavia, in three novels. The protagonist of the 2002 novel, King of the Rattling Spirits, (based on his 2001 Sweet Dreams film script) is 12 years old. In the 2015 novel, Childhood, the protagonist is five. In the third novel It's Personal, (2022) the protagonist sums up his childhood and its consequences.

His first novel Crumbs (American title The Cartier Project) was set in his hometown of Jesenice and published in 1989 and sold 54,000 copies.

He was the first Slovenian writer to write a novel about the erased, people who lost all of their rights and legal status after the declaration of the country's independence in 1991. Later he adapted the novel for the feature film Erased. The novel was translated in 10 languages and published in UK by Fly on the Wall Press.

His historical novel Paloma Negra deals with Yu-Mex music in the 1950s, when Yugoslav singers started mimicking the songs and music they saw in Mexican films. During the research for the novel, Mazzini recorded the stories told by protagonists and made a documentary called Yugoslav Mexico (YuMex). The novel German Lottery is set in the same era but deals with swindlers, illusions and unreliable protagonists.

Mazzini introduced in the post-1990 Slovene literature a tough protagonist, characteristic of Noir fiction, in his novel Guarding Hanna.

His work was selected for international anthologies; including his short story "Mother" included in Contemporary European Fiction, and "Avro Lancaster" in Best European Fiction 2018.

== Awards ==
The Cartier Project won the 1987 Best Novel of the Year award from both pro-government and opposition newspapers.

In 2012, one of his stories ("That Winter") received the Pushcart Prize.

Mazzini won the 2016 Kresnik Award for his novel Otroštvo (Childhood).

in 2019 he won best screenplay for the film Erased at FEST festival, Belgrade, Serbia, and at the Raindance festival, London, UK.

== Reviews ==
"In ... Guarding Hanna, [Mazzini] has created a bestial protagonist ... a gargoyle of a man [who] struggles heroically with his own nature only to find that life has played him one horrific joke."
— The Village Voice

"[Hanna's] a wonderful creation: vulnerable, lonely, trying to keep her mood upbeat but not always succeeding. In fact, she’s just the thing to melt the Beast’s hostility—or drive him, with her chatter, to homicidal distraction....Throw in the narrator’s grim musings on his lot in life and his occasional urge to strangle Hanna, and you have a tonic mix of menace and comedy that keeps things hopping right up to the book’s twist ending."
— The Seattle Times

== Commentary ==
In October 2019, Mazzini commented on the decision of the Swedish Academy to give the Nobel Prize for literature to Peter Handke by saying, "some artists sold their human souls for ideologies (Hamsun and Nazism), some for hate (Celine and his rabid antisemitism), some for money and power (Kusturica) but the one that offended me the most was Handke with his naivety for the Milošević regime (...) I found him cruel and totally self-absorbed in his naivety."

== Bibliography ==
=== Novels in English ===
- Guarding Hanna (2003)
- The Cartier Project (2004)
- King of the Rattling Spirits (2005)
- The Collector of Names (2009)
- German Lottery (2012)
- Crumbs (2014)
- Paloma Negra (2014)
- Erased (2026)

=== E-books ===
- "Mother"

== Films ==
- Cartier Project (1991, TV film, scriptwriter)
- You're Free. Decide. (1999, short film, scriptwriter and director)
- Sweet Dreams (2001, feature film, scriptwriter)
- The Orphan with the magic voice (2003, short film, scriptwriter and director)
- A Very Simple Story (2008, short film, scriptwriter and director)
- Erased (2018, feature film, scriptwriter and director)

== Multilingual web film project ==
A Very Simple Story is a script in multiple languages, read by actresses from different countries. Mazzini was the screenwriter and director of both the Slovenian (8:28) and Italian (9:57) films. The project was nominated for the Prix Europe award.
