= King of the Rattling Spirits =

2001 novel by Miha Mazzini

King of the Rattling Spirits (novel)
- Author: Miha Mazzini
- Original title: Kralj ropotajočih duhov
- Translator: Maja Visenjak Limon
- Language: English
- Genre: Novel
- Publisher: Scala House Press
- Publication date: 2001
- English publication date: 2004
- Media type: Print, paperback
- Pages: 287 pp
- ISBN: 0-9720287-5-7
- Preceded by: Guarding Hanna
- Followed by: Collector of Names

King of the Rattling Spirits is a novel by Miha Mazzini. It was first published in Slovenia in 2001, with a second edition in 2008 and third edition in 2011, under the title of 'Kralj ropotajočih duhov'. The author has explored other ways to tell the fictionalized autobiographic story before the novel. Those included short story published in 1995 as illustrated text in Ars Vivendi magazin, and years later a screenplay for his film Sweet Dreams that won several awards at different film festivals in 2001. The novel was selected as one of 100 books to read from Eastern Europe and Central Asia by Calvert Journal.

== Plot ==
The novel is first person narrative of a twelve year old Egon who tries to become a normal teenager with normal teenage problems of growing up in a milieu of little industrial town in then Tito's Yugoslavia with open borders to the West that allowed free visits to the other side of the iron curtain that was not so iron at the borders between modern day Slovenia and Italy, in times of record players and popular and less popular alternative music records. However, for Egon, having normal teenage problems is a hard task for him.

At home he is exposed to his grandmothers PTSD, which she got from World War One because of which she keeps having hallucinations of dead souls and she makes sure that Egon keeps watching dreadful illustrations of martyrs from her little book of Catholic saints and apologize to dead souls for stepping on them accidentally, which only she can see.

As well at home he is exposed to neglect and scapegoating by his single mother, who is in conflict with his nona.

As if that isn't enough (and too much) for a child, he gets sexually abused by teacher at school who keeps molesting him at school. Also a beautiful girl is also sexually abused by her own father at home and because of that - as the narrator tells at the end of the novel - finds escape from her nightmarish life in her death (suicide) at the end. Egon can only dream of having the kind of problems his teenage peers have, that would be sweet dreams for him.

Egon survives in the novel, but has to pay a high price for the survival, a price paid by many survivors of childhood sexual abuse. Because the double life they are forced to live daily, they would need help from an adult who they could trust and who would understand them in order to integrate it, they have no other choice but to escape into new identity, which in contrast to their real child's self, who is helpless, becomes a king over the dark kingdom of nona, mother and school, as the king of (their) rattling ghosts.

== Translations ==
- American edition was published in 2005 by Scala House.
- Croatian edition in 2005.
- Chech edition in 2005.
- Italian edition in 2008.
- Polish edition in 2009.
- French edition in 2019.
- Spanish edition in 2023.
