= Cartier Project =

1991 television film by Miran Zupanič

Cartier Project is a 1991 Slovenian TV film based upon the novel The Cartier Project by Miha Mazzini. The Slovenian title is Operacija Cartier.

It was produced by TV Slovenija and runs 90 minutes.

== Crew ==
- Director: Miran Zupanič
- Screenplay: Miha Mazzini
- Cinematographer: Radovan Čok
- Editor: Neva Fajon
- Music: Urban Koder

== Cast ==
- Borut Veselko (Egon)
- Faruk Begoli (Selim)
- Haris Burina (Ibro)
- Srečo Špik (Poet)
- Judita Zidar (Karla)
- Brane Grubar (Lojze)
- Žan Marolt (Fačo)
- Ratko Polič (Guard)

== Awards ==
1. Slovenian film of the year, selected by the audience
2. Borut Veselko - actor of the year, selected by the audience
3. Winner of Prix CIRCOM REGIONAL Fiction 1992
