= Eraser (disambiguation) =

An eraser is a tool for removing marks made by pencil, pen, chalk or art brushes.

Eraser(s) or The Eraser(s) may also refer to:

== Music ==
- Erasers, an American punk band (1977–1981) fronted by Susan Beschta
- The Eraser, 2006 album by Thom Yorke
- Eraser (album), a 2011 album by The Knux
- "Eraser" (No Age song), 2008
- "Eraser" (Ed Sheeran song), 2017
- "Eraser", a song on the 1994 album The Downward Spiral by Nine Inch Nails
- "Eraser", a song on the 2004 album The Arrival by Hypocrisy

== Other ==
- Eraser (film), a 1996 film starring Arnold Schwarzenegger
- Eraser: Reborn, its 2022 reboot
- "The Eraser", an episode from the second season of MacGyver
- Eraser (software), a secure file erasure tool for Windows
- Eraser (comics), a minor DC Comics supervillain
- Eraser, a character from the first season of Battle for Dream Island, an animated web series

== See also ==
- Erase (disambiguation)
- Erased (disambiguation)
- Erasure (disambiguation)
