= Erase =

Erase may refer to:

- Erase (album), a 1994 death metal album by Gorefest
- "Erase/Rewind", a 1998 pop/rock song by The Cardigans
- "Erase", a song by All That Remains from the 2002 album Behind Silence and Solitude
- "Erase", a song by Dawn of Solace from the 2022 album Flames of Perdition
- "Erase", a song by Imminence from the 2019 album Turn the Light On
- "Erase", a song by In Hearts Wake from the 2015 album Skydancer
- "Erase", a song by Neurosis and Jarboe from the 2003 album Neurosis & Jarboe
- "Erase", a song by They Might Be Giants from the 2015 album Glean

== See also ==
- Deletion (disambiguation)
- Erased (disambiguation)
- Eraser (disambiguation)
- Erasure (disambiguation)
- Operation Eraze, Indian military operation during the Indo-Pakistani war of 1947–1948
