= IsoBuster =

Data recovery software

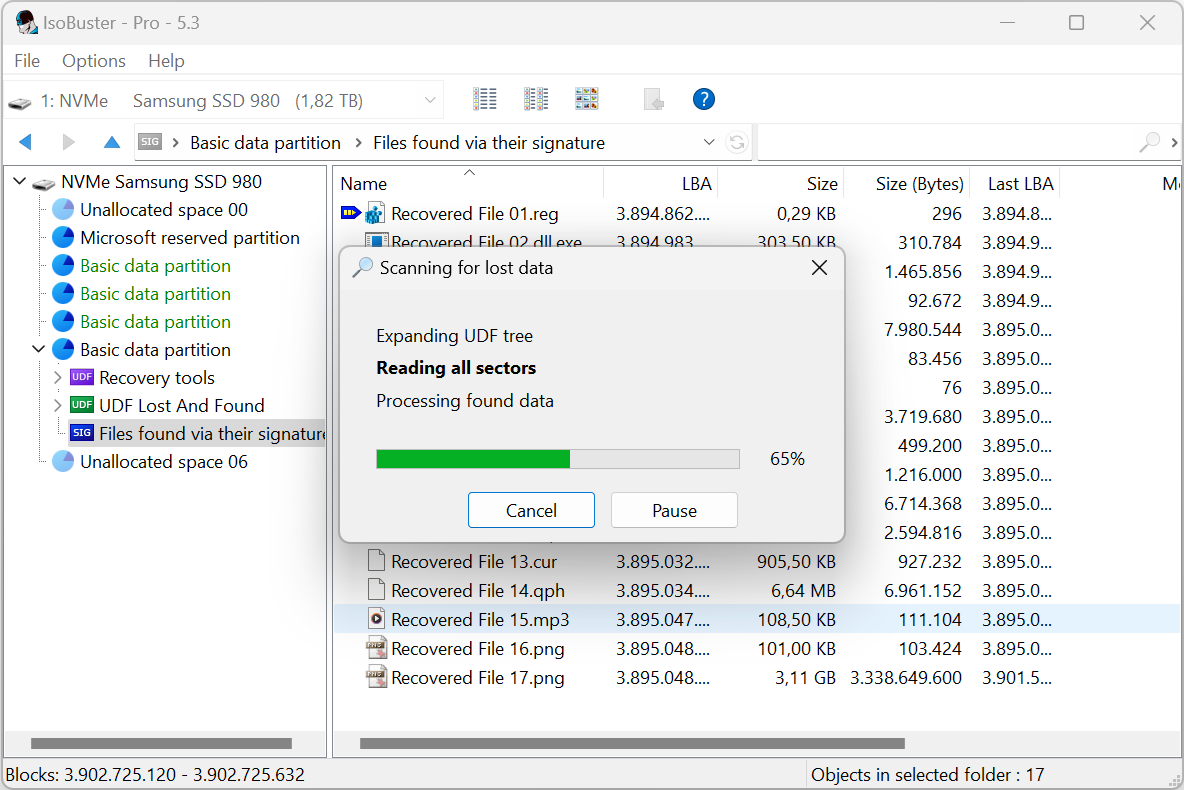
- IsoBuster 5.3
- Developer: Smart Projects
- Stable release: 5.8 / 11 May 2026
- Operating system: Microsoft Windows
- Available in: 34 languages
- List of languages English, Afrikaans, Albanian, Arabic, Brazilian, Bulgarian, Catalan, Chinese (simplified), Chinese (traditional), Croatian, Czech, Danish, Dutch, Finnish, French, German, Greek, Hindi, Hungarian, Indonesian, Italian, Japanese, Persian, Polish, Portuguese, Romanian, Russian, Slovenian, Spanish, Swedish, Thai, Turkish, Ukrainian, Vietnamese
- Type: Data recovery, Computer Forensics
- License: Shareware
- Website: www.isobuster.com

IsoBuster is a data recovery computer program by Smart Projects, a Belgian company founded in 1995 by Peter Van Hove. As of version 3.0, it can recover data from damaged file systems or physically damaged disks including optical discs, hard disk drives, USB flash drives and solid-state disks. It has the ability to access "deleted" data on multisession optical discs, and allows users to access disc images (including ISO, BIN and NRG) and to extract files in the same way that they would from a ZIP archive. IsoBuster is also often used by law enforcement and data forensics experts.

== See also ==
- List of data recovery software
