= The Erased =

People in Slovenia without a legal status after independence

The Erased (Slovene: Izbrisani) is the name used in the media for a group of people in Slovenia that remained without a legal status after the declaration of the country's independence in 1991.

== Identity ==
The "erased" were mainly people from other former Yugoslav republics, who had been living in Slovenia. They are mostly of non-Slovene or mixed ethnicity, and they include a significant number of members of Romani communities.

Some of those affected by the "erasure" included former Yugoslav People's Army officers who did not apply for or were refused Slovenian citizenship, often on the grounds that they participated in the war against Slovenia or were otherwise deemed disloyal to Slovenia.

Some of the "erased" were born in Slovenia but, on the basis of the republican citizenship and birthplace of their parents, had remained SFRY citizens of other Yugoslav republics. Others had moved to Slovenia from other parts of Yugoslavia before the country's dissolution, and remained there after 1991.

== History ==
In 1991, immediately after the declaration of independence by Slovenia, the approximately 200,000 residents of Slovenia who had citizenship of other republics of former Yugoslavia were granted the possibility to obtain, through an application, the citizenship of the new independent state. The law required anyone else residing in Slovenia to register as "foreign" (a term denoting legal permanent residents without citizenship). Approximately 170,000 individuals presented the application, obtaining citizenship before the national elections in 1992. Some thousands did not receive citizenship.

The majority of those who, contrary to legal provisions, did not register themselves as "foreigners" were removed from the registry of Permanent Residence in February 1992, losing all social, civil, and political rights. This action was of purely administrative nature (and thus excluded any possibility of appeal) and struck, according to unofficial estimates, over 18,000 people, including some who had actually left the country, while others were simply unaware of the existence of the law that required them to confirm their status through a new application. When they came into contact with the police, they were treated like illegal immigrants and sometimes deported.

In 1999 the Constitutional Court declared the act of "erasing" illegal and unconstitutional, and annulled its legal consequences. In the same year the Slovenian Parliament promulgated a law that offered the "erased" the opportunity to regain residence, but only to those who lived permanently in Slovenian territory. The Constitutional Court abrogated this law as another attempt in the same direction.

In 2003 the Court declared unconstitutional the 1992 Law that required residents with Slovenian citizenship of other Yugoslav republics to explicitly ask to obtain the status of "alien", and ordered the return of the status of residents at all "erased" with retroactive function (regardless of whether they actually did not live in Slovenia after 1992). Many lawyers (among others some former members of the Constitutional Court and several authors of the Constitution) harshly criticized this decision, since it annulled a legal provision included in the country's constitutional laws and thus, according to them, beyond the Court's jurisdiction.

The decision was followed by a harsh and lasting controversy, in which the LDS-led government gradually accepted the decisions taken by the Constitutional Court, while the opposition (SDS, N.Si, SLS and SNS) continued to criticize it. In February 2004, the parliamentary majority passed a law in accordance with the decision of the Court (which provided for the retroactivity only for those who were already in possession of residence); two months later, however, this law (called "Technical Law on the erased") was annulled by a referendum (supported by the centre-right opposition). This referendum was strongly contested by some institutions of the European Union.

As of 2007 the number of the "erased" was imprecise, with the group fragmented into different legal categories: some have regained residency and citizenship, some only residence, some were expelled, many of them are living in Slovenia illegally. According to some estimates there are still 6,000 people without legal status, while many of those who managed to get the right to permanent residency had to pay heavily for the consequences of years of irregularities.

The issue was brought before the European Commission, which stated that it does not have jurisdiction over such matter. Some of the affected made a collective appeal to the European Court of Human Rights in Strasbourg, claiming that "The cancellation is a European problem, because it violates fundamental human rights provided by the EU Convention." In 2012 the Grand Chamber of the ECHR decided the case (Kurić and Others v. Slovenia) in favour of the applicants (several of the "erased").

In 2005, and again in 2007, the SDS-led government proposed the regulation of the status of the "erased" by a Constitutional law that would treat each case individually. On both occasions, this compromise was rejected by the centre-left opposition.

An article from 2013 published by B92 stated that over 26,000 people had their residence rights taken away in February 1992, ending up in a situation "worse than refugees", since they had no possibilities for work and social protection.

== Literature ==
- Erased is a novel by Miha Mazzini, published in Slovenia in 2014, about a woman who was one of the Erased. English translation was published in 2026 by Fly On The Wall Press.

== Film ==
- Erased is a 2018 film, directed by Miha Mazzini and Dusan Joksimovic.

== Campaign ==
- Erased for 16 Years (2007 campaign) was a 2007 Slovenian national campaign, by Poper studio, which created a broad public discourse around the erasure by bringing the stories of the Erased to the Slovenian public in an intimate and dialogic manner. The campaign has connected different media outlets and used public intervention strategies.

== See also ==
- Anti-Romani sentiment
- Statelessness
- Non-citizens (Latvia)
