= Open Books =

American nonprofit organization

- Formation: 2006
- Type: Non-profit
- Purpose: To improve Chicago's literacy rate
- Headquarters: 651 W Lake St. Chicago, Illinois 60661; United States
- Founder: Stacy Ratner
- Website: www.open-books.org

Open Books is a nonprofit organization based in Chicago, Illinois, that sells donated books to fund literacy programs for kids. Founded by Stacy Ratner in 2006, Open Books has since started several literacy programs for kids, and has taken part in literacy events in Chicago. Open Books has three store locations, based in Pilsen, West Loop, and Logan Square areas of Chicago. Open Books employs adult volunteers who work in their bookstores, and with participants during literacy workshops.

== History of Organization ==
Open Books was founded in 2006 by Stacy Ratner, the organizations' executive director. Ratner attended Brandeis University and Boston College Law School, and later, Northwestern University’s Kellogg School of Management. Open Books began in Ratner's basement in the South Loop, where she and Becca Keaty collected and organized donated books. After three months, they acquired 50,000 donated books. In 2009, Ratner opened a storefront in River North. The store held 50,000 books, 10,000 of them being children books. In 2012, 60-80 Chicago Public Schools participated in Open Books programs. As of 2012, approximately 75 percent of Open Books $1.2 million budget comes from bookstore and online sales. In 2014, Open Books opened their Pilsen store location. The next year, Open Books opened another bookstore location in the West Loop.

The founders of Open Books learned that over 53% of Chicago adult residents have deficient literacy skills. Ratner, Keaty, and Walter, and additional volunteers then began to promote literacy in the city of Chicago. Nell Klugman, volunteer coordinator for Open Books, confirms that Open Books actions focus on creating access to books and prioritizing time for reading.

== Events and Collaborations ==
On Feb. 14, March 14, and Nov, 14 in 2014, Open Books participated in The Chicago Arts Districts' "2nd Friday Gallery Night" event. The event is a monthly reception at different art studios and galleries in Chicago's Pilsen neighborhood. In July 2014, Open Books participated in Chicago’s first Independent Bookstore Day, where they offered free bags of books to attendees who arrived first. In December 2014, Open Books donated 500 children's books to the CTA annual Holiday train where they were given out at the Red, Purple, and Yellow line stops. In 2016, Open Books had its first Garage Sale event. The event took place on Saturday, April 30 at 10 a.m. until May 1 at 4:00 p.m at Open Books' Pilsen location. On April 29, 2017 Open Books held its second Garage Sale event at their Pilsen location. On March 27, 2018, Goose Island Brewhouse selected Open Books for their Charity of the Month program. On the last Tuesday of the month in 2018, Goose Island Brewery selects a local charity, and then donates a portion of their dinner proceeds for that night to the selected charity. Open Books Pilsen will be holding their third Garage Sale event on April 28–29, 2018.

== Literacy Programs ==
=== Reading Buddies ===
"Reading buddies" is a literacy program held twice a week throughout the school year, where Open Books's staff members and approved adult volunteers pair up with an elementary school student to work on literacy skills such as fluency and reading comprehension for 30 minutes.

=== Creative Writing Field Trips ===
Open Books West Loop has a creative writing field trips program for elementary and high school students where they take part in literacy games and activities, before going on to write their own work of creative literacy. After the workshop, all students receive printed copies of the classes works to keep.

=== Read Then Write ===
Read Then Write is a literacy composition and publishing program for young authors. Teens read and discuss books from a specific genre and then write their own stories in that style, which Open Books later publishes. During this program, students read through a text with a volunteer writing coach before going on to write their own creative writing works, which are published in an annual Open Books anthology.

=== Open Books Publishing Academy ===
Open Books Publishing Academy is a reading, creative writing, book access & distribution program where children create, write and professionally publish a full length novel. With the assistance of Open Books staff, writing coaches, and published authors students consult industry professionals about design and publication of their books. After the program, all finished works are displayed at Open Books' Publishing Academy Book Launch.

=== Book Grant Program ===
Through their Book Grant Program, from 2014-2015 Open Books donated over 130,000 books to community organizations to help create libraries in schools and non profit centers. Book grants help create classroom libraries, additional children’s book grants and reading resource materials.
