= Erased (2018 film) =

2019 film

- Film poster
- Directed by: Miha Mazzini
- Written by: Miha Mazzini
- Produced by: Frenk Celarc
- Starring: Judita Franković Brdar
- Cinematography: Dušan Joksimović
- Edited by: Tomislav Pavlić
- Music by: Jura Ferina, Pavao Miholjević, Vladimír Godár
- Release dates: 25 November 2018 (Tallinn); 25 November 2018 (Slovenia)
- Running time: 85 minutes
- Country: Slovenia
- Languages: Slovene; Serbo-Croatian

Erased (Slovene: Izbrisana) is a 2018 Slovenian drama film written and directed by Miha Mazzini based on his own novel of the same name. World premiere was at Tallinn Black Nights Film Festival 2018, 25. November 2018, while Slovenian one was on 25. February 2019.

The story of the film is dealing with the Slovenian erased citizens, almost 2% of the population that remained without a legal status after the declaration of the country's independence in 1991.

== Plot ==
Ana comes to the hospital to give birth. Everything goes well except for a small, bureaucratic problem: she is not in the computer. After a few days, she is entangled in a web of Kafkaesque proportions: not being in the computer means that she has no social security, no permanent address. She is suddenly a "foreigner," officially at least, even though she has spent all of her life in this country. Legally, she doesn't exist. This means that her child is an orphan, and orphans must go up for adoption.

== Awards ==
1. Miha Mazzini, best screenplay, FEST, Belgrad, 2019
2. Miha Mazzini best screenplay, Raindance festival, London, 2019
3. Judita Franković Brdar, best leading actress, Festival os Slovenian film 2018
4. Judita Franković Brdar, best leading actress in coproduction, 66. Pula film festival, Pula, Croatia, 2019
5. Judita Franković Brdar, special mention of Federation of film critics of Europe and Mediterannea - FEDEORA, 66. Pula film festival, Pula, Croatia, 2019
6. Judita Franković Brdar best leading actress, BASTAU IF, Almaty, Kazakhstan, 2019
7. Sanja Džeba best costumography, Festival slovenskega filma 2018
8. Jura Ferina, Pavao Miholjević, Vladimír Godár best original music, Festival slovenskega filma 2018
9. Matjaž Pavlovec, best set design, Festival slovenskega filma 2018

== Festivals ==
1. San Sebastián International Film Festival 2017, Španija, section Glocal in Progress (unfinished films), September 2017
2. Festival of Slovenian film 2018, September 2018 (four awards)
3. World premiere, Tallinn Black Nights Film Festival 2018, Estonia, 25. November 2018
4. Trieste Film Festival 30, 2019, Italy, competition, 21. January 2019
5. FEST Belgrade, Serbia, 2019, competition, 1. March 2019 (ena nagrada)
6. Festival International du Film d'Aubagne, France, 2019, competition, 19. March 2019
7. LICHTER Filmfest Frankfurt International, Germany, Extra Regional program, 30. March 2019
8. IFF Panamá, Festival Internacional de Cine de Panamá, Panama, 6. - 8. April 2019
9. Cleveland International Film Festival, ZDA, East Europe Competition, 3. - 6. April 2019,
10. Festival tolerancije - JFF Zagreb, Croatia, 13. April 2019
11. Fajr International Film Festival, Iran, April 2019,
12. Neisse Filmfestival, Germany - Poland - Czech republic, 12. April 2019
13. 21114 – Film fest, Novi Sad, Serbia, 13. June 2019
14. Valletta Film Fest Competition, Malta, 14. June 2019
15. Pula film festival, Croatia, 15. July 2019 (two awards)
16. Manarat IFF, Tunisia, 1. July 2019
17. Oostende IFF, Belgium, 6. September 2019
18. Raindance IFF, Anglija, 26. - 28. September 2019 (one award)
19. Ravac IFF, Moldovia, 2. October 2019
20. 43ª Mostra internacional de cinema, São Paulo, Brasil, October 2019
21. Crime & Panishment, Turkey, competition, November 2019
22. Eastern Neighbours Film Festival, Netherland, 7. November 2019
23. Zagreb FF, Croatia, 7. November 2019
24. Balkan Film Festival Ulm, Germany, 8. November 2019
25. 20e Arras Film Festival, France, November 2019
26. BASTAU IF, Almaty, Kazakhstan, 3. - 7. December 2019 (ena nagrada)
27. Valjevski filmski susreti, Valjevo, Serbia, 15. December 2019
28. Balkan Film Festival, Roma, Italy, 8. to 11. October 2020
29. Gangneung International Film Festival 5-14 Nov. 2020, South Korea (literature and film section)

== See also ==
- List of Slovenian films
