= File carving =

Data recovery technique

File carving is the process of reassembling computer files from fragments in the absence of filesystem metadata.

It is used in IT forensics and data recovery. Carving is typically used on storage media with a corrupted file system or for storage areas that are listed as free in the existing file system.

== Introduction and basic principles ==
All filesystems contain some metadata that describes the actual file system. At a minimum, this includes the hierarchy of folders and files, with names for each. The filesystem will also record the physical locations on the storage device where each file is stored. As explained below, a file might be scattered in fragments at different physical addresses.

File carving is the process of trying to recover files without this metadata. This is done by analyzing the raw data and identifying what it is (text, executable, png, mp3, etc.). This can be done in different ways, but the simplest is to look for the file signature or "magic numbers" that mark the beginning and/or end of a particular file type. For instance, every Java class file has as its first four bytes the hexadecimal value CA FE BA BE. Some files contain footers as well, making it just as simple to identify the ending of the file.

Most file systems, such as the FAT family and UNIX's Fast File System, work with the concept of clusters of an equal and fixed size. For example, a FAT32 file system might be broken into clusters of 4 KiB each. Any file smaller than 4 KiB fits into a single cluster, and there is never more than one file in each cluster. Files that take up more than 4 KiB are allocated across many clusters. Sometimes these clusters are all contiguous, while other times they are scattered across two or potentially many more so called fragments, with each fragment containing a number of contiguous clusters storing one part of the file's data. Obviously, large files are more likely to be fragmented.

Simson Garfinkel reported fragmentation statistics collected from over 350 disks containing FAT, NTFS and UFS file systems. He showed that while fragmentation in a typical disk is low, the fragmentation rate of forensically important files such as email, JPEG and Word documents is relatively high. The fragmentation rate of JPEG files was found to be 16%, Word documents had 17% fragmentation, AVI had a 22% fragmentation rate and PST files (Microsoft Outlook) had a 58% fragmentation rate (the fraction of files being fragmented into two or more fragments). Pal, Shanmugasundaram, and Memon presented an efficient algorithm based on a greedy heuristic and alpha-beta pruning for reassembling fragmented images. Pal, Sencar, and Memon introduced sequential hypothesis testing as an effective mechanism for detecting fragmentation points. Richard and Roussev presented Scalpel, an open-source file-carving tool existing since 2005 and initially based on Foremost.

File carving is a highly complex task, with a potentially huge number of permutations to try. To make this task tractable, carving software typically makes extensive use of models and heuristics. This is necessary not only from a standpoint of execution time, but also for the accuracy of the results. State-of-the-art file carving algorithms use statistical techniques like sequential hypothesis testing for determining fragmentation points.

== Motivation ==
In most cases, when a file is deleted, the entry in the file system metadata is removed but the actual data is still on the disk. File carving can be used to recover data from a hard disk where the metadata was removed or otherwise damaged. This process may be successful even after a drive is formatted or repartitioned.

File carving can be performed using free or commercial software and is often performed in conjunction with computer forensics examinations or alongside other recovery efforts (e.g. hardware repair) by data recovery companies. Whereas the primary goal of data recovery is to recover the file content, computer forensics examiners are often just as interested in the metadata such as who owned a file, where it was stored, and when it was last modified. Thus, while a forensic examiner could use file carving to prove that a file was once stored on a hard drive, they might need to seek out other evidence to prove who put it there.

== Carving schemes ==
=== Bifragment gap carving ===
Garfinkel introduced the use of fast object validation for reassembling files that have been split into two pieces. This technique is referred to as Bifragment Gap Carving (BGC). A set of starting fragments and a set of finishing fragments are identified. The fragments are reassembled if together they form a valid object.

=== SmartCarving ===
Pal developed a carving scheme that is not limited to bifragmented files. The technique, known as SmartCarving, makes use of heuristics regarding the fragmentation behavior of known filesystems. The algorithm has three phases: preprocessing, collation, and reassembly. In the preprocessing phase, blocks are decompressed and/or decrypted if necessary. In the collation phase, blocks are sorted according to their file type. In the reassembly phase, the blocks are placed in sequence to reproduce the deleted files. The SmartCarving algorithm is the basis for the Adroit Photo Forensics and Adroit Photo Recovery applications from Digital Assembly.

== Carving memory dumps ==
Snapshots of computers' volatile memory (i.e. RAM) can be carved. Memory-dump carving is routinely used in digital forensics, allowing investigators to access ephemeral evidence. Ephemeral evidence includes recently accessed images and Web pages, documents, chats and communications committed via social networks. For example, LiME can be used in conjunction with Volatility to do such a task. If an encrypted volume (TrueCrypt, BitLocker, PGP Disk) was used, binary keys to encrypted containers can be extracted and used to instantly mount such volumes. The content of volatile memory gets fragmented. A proprietary carving algorithm was developed by Belkasoft to enable carving fragmented memory sets (BelkaCarving).

== See also ==
- Data recovery
- Error detection and correction
- Data archaeology
- Foremost (software)
- PhotoRec
- Recover My Files
- IsoBuster
