= Ddrescue =

Data recovery tool

ddrescue
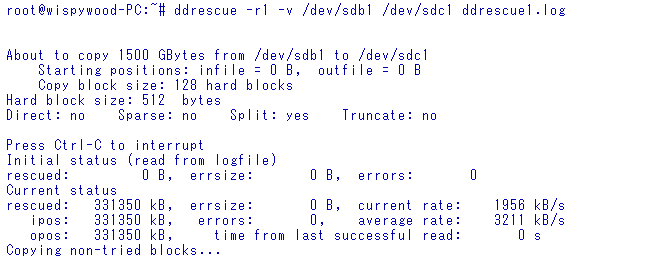
- Original author: Antonio Diaz Diaz
- Initial release: 12 August 2004; 21 years ago
- Stable release: 1.30 / 2 January 2026
- Repository: ftp.gnu.org/gnu/ddrescue/
- Written in: C++
- Operating system: Unix-like
- Type: Data recovery
- License: 2014: GPL-2.0-or-later (Note: GPL-2.0-or-later since version 1.19 (2014-10-03).); 2007: GPL-3.0-or-later (Note: GPL-3.0-or-later from version 1.5 (2007-06-29) until version 1.18.1 (2014-06-10).); 2004: GPL-2.0-or-later (Note: GPL-2.0-or-later from version 0.1 (2004-08-12) until version 1.4 (2007-06-18).)
- Website: gnu.org/s/ddrescue/

GNU ddrescue is a data recovery tool for disk drives, DVDs, CDs, and other digital storage media. It copies raw blocks of storage, such as disk sectors, from one device or file to another, while handling read errors in an intelligent manner to minimize data loss by scraping good sectors from partially read blocks.

GNU ddrescue is written in the C++ programming language, and is available as open-source software that was originally released in 2004. It is also available in binary form as a component in most Linux distributions.

== Description ==
ddrescue uses a sophisticated algorithm to copy data from disk drives, and other storage devices, causing as little additional damage, if they are failing, as possible. It is considered to have the most sophisticated implementation of a block-size-changing algorithm in free and open source software, and is considered an essential data recovery tool.

The status of the copy process is recorded in a map file (previously called logfile) that aids in the progress of multiple stages of the recovery algorithm, and facilitates interrupting the recovery, and repeating it as needed to recover more data. The program does not write zeros to the output in place of bad blocks, so that additional errors not encountered previously do not destroy previously recovered blocks. This makes it possible to merge multiple defective copies of CDs or DVDs into one backup file. By virtue of the map file, only the needed blocks are read from the second and successive copies.

=== Algorithm ===
The algorithm of ddrescue is described in its manual. Broadly:

1. Every block starts as "non-tried".
2. (Copying) A regular copy in large blocks with a time limit is performed to quickly copy the "good" parts of the medium. The parts that have timed out are retried in reverse with a time limit. Then a forward large-block pass without time limit is applied to the remaining blocks, then a reverse large-block pass. The remaining blocks are considered problematic and "non-trimmed", i.e. candidates for trimming.
3. (Trimming) For each non-trimmed block, copy sector-by-sector from the start to find the first failed position and mark it as a bad sector. Then copy sector-from-sector from the end to find the last failed position. Any edge adjacent to a known bad sector is not considered a candidate for trimming. The remaining sectors are candidates for "scraping".
4. (Scraping) For the remaining "non-scraped" blocks, copy them sector by sector. Failures are marked bad sectors.
5. (Retrying) Optionally go through the remaining bad sectors by reading sector by sector forwards and then backwards, until the retry limit is met. The default is to not retry at all.

When interrupted the progress is saved to a mapfile. During startup the mapfile is read to determine what needs to be done.

=== Fill mode ===
ddrescue also features a fill mode, able to selectively overwrite parts of the output file using a supplied mapfile, using a selector string that describes that state of blocks are to be overwritten. It does not rescue anything. Uses include:

- Fill the parts of an image corresponding to bad sectors in the map file with the text "BAD-SECTOR_" repeated many times.
- Fill the parts of an image corresponding to non-copied parts in the map file with the text "NON-RESCUED-SECTOR_" repeated many times.
- Fill the parts of a source disk (a block device is a file on *nix systems) corresponding to non-bad sectors in the map with zero, wiping all the good parts before sending it to the manufacturer for warranty replacement.
- Fill the parts of a source disk corresponding to bad sectors in the map with zero, to force a remap of bad sectors.

== Unrelated recovery tools ==
GNU ddrescue is not a derivative of dd which also copies blocks of storage from disk storage, but does not operate in a strategic, algorithmic manner.

GNU ddrescue is also distinct from the similarly named program dd_rescue.

== See also ==
- Backup
- Disk cloning
- GNU Project
