= GetDataBack =

GetDataBack is a data recovery software developed by Runtime Software. It can be used to recover data from external and internal hard disks, flash cards, USB drives, etc. with the FAT, ExFAT, NTFS, Ext, HFS+ and APFS file systems, although different variants of the program are needed for each file system. Registration of the software is required in order to recover data with the software.

== Reviews ==
- Softpedia
