= Black Duck Software =

American application security company

Black Duck Software, Inc.
- Type: Private
- Industry: Application security
- Founded: 2002; 24 years ago
- Founder: Doug Levin
- Headquarters: Burlington, Massachusetts, United States
- Key people: Greg Hughes, CEO
- Owner: Clearlake Capital Group; Francisco Partners
- Number of employees: 2,000 (2024)
- Website: www.blackduck.com

Black Duck Software is a private company that develops and markets software and services for application security. Founded in 2002 by Doug Levin, it is headquartered near Boston, Massachusetts.

== History ==
Black Duck was founded in December 2002 by Doug Levin. In 2017, eight years after raising $38.5 million in venture capital funding, the firm raised $75.5 million.

It was acquired by Synopsys for $565 million in 2017 and became part of the Synopsys Software Integrity Group. The firm was combined with several other Synopsys acquisitions, such as code analysis company Coverity, interactive application security testing software Seeker, Cigital, and Codiscope.

In 2024, the Synopsys Software Integrity Group was sold to private equity firms Clearlake Capital Group and Francisco Partners for $2.1 billion. The new owners rebranded the company back to its original Black Duck Software name.

== Products ==
Screenshot of Black Duck Polaris Platform

Black Duck provides software and services for software development security testing. The company initially focused on software that identified usage of open-source code and determined corresponding security and licensing risks. Over time, it expanded to various application security tools and services related to training, support, and development, for developers. In 2024, it began using generative artificial intelligence to identify potential security risks for customers. In December 2025, it released a tool that uses AI models and agents to find potential vulnerabilities in software code and propose fixes.
