= Psychology in cybersecurity =

Study of human behavior and cognitive factors in information security

The psychology of cybersecurity is an interdisciplinary field studying how human behavior, cognitive biases, and social dynamics influence information security. While traditional cybersecurity focuses on hardware and software vulnerabilities, this discipline addresses human factors, which are exploited in cyberattacks and cybercrime. The study of psychology in cybersecurity draws from cognitive psychology and human–computer interaction, and it intersects with usable security and cyberpsychology.

For example, psychologists consider optimism bias, hyperbolic discounting, and behavioral economics as factors in people's decisions related to their information privacy.

== See also ==
- Alarm fatigue
- Engineering psychology
- Information security awareness
- Password fatigue
- Password psychology
- Social engineering
