= Hoxhunt =

Software company

- Type: Private
- Industry: Cybersecurity, SaaS
- Founded: 2016
- Founders: Mika Aalto, Karri Kurunmäki, Pasi Salo, Pyry Åvist
- Headquarters: Helsinki, Finland
- Area served: Worldwide
- Key people: Mika Aalto (CEO)
- Number of employees: 200+
- Website: www.hoxhunt.com

Hoxhunt is a B2B software as a service (SaaS) company that develops a cybersecurity training platform for phishing simulations and security awareness training through a gamified approach to human risk management.

In 2025, it was listed in TIME World's Top EdTech Companies list.

== History ==
Hoxhunt was founded in 2016 in Helsinki, Finland by Mika Aalto, Karri Kurunmäki, Pasi Salo and Pyry Åvist.

In 2017, the company secured seed funding from Icebreaker.vc with participation from First Fellow Partners, and in October 2018, Hoxhunt raised €2.5 million in a round led by Dawn Capital, with participation from Icebreaker.vc and Risto Siilasmaa's First Fellow Partners. In May 2022, it raised $40 million in a Series B led by Level Equity Management, with participation from Icebreaker.vc. In 2022, the company expanded its operations to North America.

In 2023, Hoxhunt was listed in the Deloitte Technology Fast 50 Finland list with 469% growth for 2019–2022.

In 2025, the company was listed in TIME World's Top EdTech Companies list.

== Products and services ==
The Hoxhunt platform delivers security awareness training through automated phishing simulations and individualized feedback. The platform simulates scam emails that use titles, organizations, industry, language, and geographic location that are tailored to users' context and awards users points for identifying and reporting them. The system adapts training content to employee behavior and emerging cybersecurity threats and attack methods to increase their realism. Microsoft documentation lists Hoxhunt among third-party user-report tools integrated with Defender for Office 365, allowing end users to report suspicious messages directly through the platform. The company also conducts research and publishes reports on cybersecurity awareness and threat trends, such as studies on the rise of QR code ("quishing") phishing campaigns and experiments comparing AI-generated spear phishing with traditional phishing methods.

== Operations ==
Hoxhunt is headquartered in Helsinki, Finland and operates in the U.S. through Hoxhunt Inc., incorporated in Delaware with an office in Minneapolis, Minnesota. As of August 2025, Hoxhunt has 200+ employees.

== See also ==
- Internet Security Awareness Training
- Phishing
- Security awareness
- Social engineering
