= The Protection of Information in Computer Systems =

Information security publication (1975)

- Created: 1975
- Authors: Jerome Saltzer; Michael Schroeder
- Subject: Information security

The Protection of Information in Computer Systems is a 1975 seminal publication by Jerome Saltzer and Michael Schroeder about information security. The paper was published in the Proceedings of the IEEE journal. The paper emphasized that the primary concern of security measures should be the information on computers and not the computers itself.

It was published 10 years prior to Trusted Computer System Evaluation Criteria, commonly known as the Orange Book.

== Design principles ==
The following design principles are laid out in the paper:

- Economy of mechanism: Keep the design as simple and small as possible.
- Fail-safe defaults: Base access decisions on permission rather than exclusion.
- Complete mediation: Every access to every object must be checked for authority.
- Open design: The design should not be secret.
- Separation of privilege: Where feasible, a protection mechanism that requires two keys to unlock it is more robust and flexible than one that allows access to the presenter of only a single key.
- Least privilege: Every program and every user of the system should operate using the least set of privileges necessary to complete the job.
- Least common mechanism: Minimize the amount of mechanism common to more than one user and depended on by all users.
- Psychological acceptability: It is essential that the human interface be designed for ease of use, so that users routinely and automatically apply the protection mechanisms correctly.
- Work factor: Compare the cost of circumventing the mechanism with the resources of a potential attacker.
- Compromise recording: It is sometimes suggested that mechanisms that reliably record that a compromise of information has occurred can be used in place of more elaborate mechanisms that completely prevent loss.

== See also ==
- Common Criteria
- Secure by design
- Defense in depth
