= Martin Loeb =

Martin Loeb may refer to:

- Martin Löb (1921–2006), German mathematician
- Martin P. Loeb, professor of accounting and information assurance
- Martin Loeb (actor) (1959–2025), French actor and artist
