= UMLsec =

UMLsec is an extension to the Unified Modeling Language for integrating security related information in UML specifications. This information can be used for model-based security engineering. Most security information is added using stereotypes and covers many security properties including secure information flow, confidentiality, and access control. Using an attacker model these properties can be checked on a model level.

== Development ==
It was first proposed by Jürjens et al. in 2002 and later revised and extended by the same author.

== Profile definition ==
UMLsec is defined as a lightweight extension for UML.

The profile is defined through a set of prototypes with properties (tag definitions) and constraints. UMLsec defines 21 stereotypes listed below.

Stereotype	Base class	Tags	Description
fair exchange	subsystem	start, stop, adversary	enforce the fair exchange principle on communication. That is, ensure no cheating of cooperating parties.
provable	subsystem	action, cert, adversary	provide evidence of activities to obtain non-repudiation.
rbac	subsystem	protected, role, right	enforce role-based access control.
Internet	link		Internet connection. It is assumed to be susceptible to message deletion, addition, and content exposure by the default attacker.
encrypted	link		model an encrypted connection. It is assumed to be susceptible to message deletion by the default attackers.
LAN	link, node		LAN connection or a LAN network (node). It is assumed to be unaffected by the default external attacker.
wire	link		wire connection. It is assumed to be unaffected by the default external attacker.
smart card POS device issuer node	node		Nodes with varying protection mechanisms. Adversary definitions determine to what extent these nodes may be tampered with. They are assumed to be unaffected by the default external attacker.
secrecy integrity high	dependency		dependency that indicates an assumption of secrecy and integrity as well as high sensitivity.
critical	object subsystem	secrecy, integrity, authenticity, high, fresh	label a system or object as critical. Tags are used to define in what respect the system/object is critical.
secure links	subsystem	adversary	enforce secure communication links under the defined adversary model.
secure dependencies	subsystem		ensure that secure dependencies are met.
data security	subsystem	adversary, integrity, authenticity	enforce basic security requirements under the defined adversary model.
no down-flow, no up-flow	subsystem		ensure secure information flow.
guarded access	subsystem		ensure that guarded objects are accessed only through their guards.
guarded	object	guard	specify a guarded object that can only be accessed through the object specified by the guard tag.

== Adversary model ==
To ensure security it is necessary to specify what kind of attacker is assumed. In UMLsec, the attacker model is defined through the threats that it poses. The table below defines the default adversary. Other adversaries may of course be defined.

Stereotype	Threats_{default}()
Internet	{delete, read, insert}
encrypted	{delete}
LAN	∅
wire	∅
smart card	∅
POS device	∅
issuer node	∅
