= Runtime application self-protection =

Computer security technology

Runtime application self-protection (RASP) is a security technology that uses runtime instrumentation to detect and block computer attacks by taking advantage of information from inside the running software. The technology differs from perimeter-based protections such as firewalls, that can only detect and block attacks by using network information without contextual awareness. RASP technology is said to improve the security of software by monitoring its inputs, and blocking those that could allow attacks, while protecting the runtime environment from unwanted changes and tampering. RASP-protected applications rely less on external devices like firewalls to provide runtime security protection. When a threat is detected RASP can prevent exploitation and possibly take other actions, including terminating a user's session, shutting the application down, alerting security personnel and sending a warning to the user. RASP aims to close the gap left by application security testing and network perimeter controls, neither of which have enough insight into real-time data and event flows to either prevent vulnerabilities slipping through the review process or block new threats that were unforeseen during development.

== Implementation ==
RASP can be integrated as a framework or module that runs in conjunction with a program's codes, libraries and system calls. The technology can also be implemented as a virtualization. RASP is similar to interactive application security testing (IAST), the key difference is that IAST is focused on identifying vulnerabilities within the applications and RASPs are focused protecting against cybersecurity attacks that may take advantages of those vulnerabilities or other attack vectors.

== Deployment options ==
RASP solutions can be deployed in two different ways: monitor or protection mode. In monitor mode, the RASP solution reports on web application attacks but does not block any attack. In protection mode, the RASP solution reports and blocks web application attacks.

== Future Research ==
- Pursue "integrated" approaches that support both development-time and runtime
- Explore decentralized coordination, planning, and optimization approaches
- Explore quantitative and qualitative approaches to assess overall security posture

== See also ==
- Runtime verification
- Runtime error detection
- Dynamic program analysis
