= Standard of Good Practice =

Standard of Good Practice may refer to:

- Standard of Good Practice for Information Security
- Good practice
- Best practice
