= Jerry Saltzer =

American computer scientist (born 1939)

Jerome H. Saltzer
- Born: October 9, 1939 (age 87); Nampa, Idaho, United States
- Education: Massachusetts Institute of Technology
- Known for: Multics, Project Athena, MIT License
- Awards: 2010 Computer Systems Security Award of the National Institute of Standards and Technology (NIST)
- Scientific career
- Thesis: Traffic control in a multiplexed computer system (1966)
- Doctoral advisor: Fernando J. Corbató
- Doctoral students: David P. Reed; David D. Clark; Deborah Estrin; Roger R. Schell; Michael Schroeder
- Website: web.mit.edu/Saltzer/

Jerome Howard "Jerry" Saltzer (born October 9, 1939) is an American computer scientist.

== Career ==
Jerry Saltzer received an ScD in Electrical Engineering from MIT in 1966. His dissertation 'Traffic Control in a Multiplexed System' was advised by Fernando J. Corbató. In 1966, he joined the faculty of the Department of Electrical Engineering and Computer Science at MIT.

One of Saltzer's earliest involvements with computers was with MIT's Compatible Time-Sharing System in the early 1960s. In the later 1960s and early 1970s, he was one of the team leaders of the Multics operating system project. Multics, though not particularly commercially successful in itself, has had a major impact on all subsequent operating systems; in particular, it was an inspiration for Ken Thompson to develop Unix. Saltzer's contributions to Multics included the now-standard kernel stack switching method of process switching, as well as oft-cited work on the security architecture for shared information systems.

Saltzer led the Computer Systems Research group of MIT's Laboratory for Computer Science. In the late 1970s and early 1980s, the Computer Systems Research group was one of the key players in the development of the Internet and ring network technology for local area networks. During this time, Saltzer patented the Proteon ProNet ring network. He is the co-author of The Protection of Information in Computer Systems.

From 1984 to 1988 Saltzer served as Technical Director of MIT's Project Athena. "Saltzermit.edu" is one of the few Athena usernames with a capital letter, and legend has it that several special case hacks were required to support this functionality. In September 1995 Saltzer retired from his full-time faculty position, but continued writing and teaching part-time at MIT.

== Family ==
Saltzer is known to all (colleagues, students, friends and family) as "Jerry". In 1961 he married Marlys Anne Hughes. They have two children: Rebecca (born 1962) and Sarah (born 1963). He has two grandchildren: Hannah (born 1997), and Caroline (born 1999).

== Other interests ==
Saltzer is also very interested in 19th century landscape art of the western United States; he has prepared the catalogue raisonné of the paintings of the painter Frederick Ferdinand Schafer.

== Software ==
Saltzer has been the programmer, a designer, or the inspiration, for a number of important pieces of systems software, which are either still in use or have descendants still being used today:

- RUNOFF, a very early text-formatting program which was the basis for roff and nroff
- TYPSET, the "Project MAC editor", was the first interactive text editor, developed to write documentation
- PCIP, the first TCP/IP stack for the IBM PC, which became the basis for a company called FTP Software
- Kerberos, an authentication protocol, part of Project Athena, still widely used today

As Technical Director of Project Athena, he supported development of the X Window System, an open-source windowing system, still used and developed on Unix-like systems.
