= Flat network =

Type of computer network design

A flat network is a computer network design approach that aims to reduce cost, maintenance and administration. Flat networks are designed to reduce the number of routers and switches on a computer network by connecting the devices to a single switch instead of separate switches. Unlike a hierarchical network design, the network is not physically separated using different switches.

The topology of a flat network is not segmented or separated into different broadcast areas by using routers. Some such networks may use network hubs or a mixture of hubs and switches, rather than switches and routers, to connect devices to each other. Generally, all devices on the network are a part of the same broadcast area.

== Uses ==
Flat networks are typically used in homes or small businesses where network requirements are low. Home networks usually do not require intensive security, or separation, because the network is often used to provide multiple computers access to the Internet. In such cases, a complex network with many switches is not required. Flat networks are also generally easier to administer and maintain because less complex switches or routers are being used. Purchasing switches can be costly, so flat networks can be implemented to help reduce the amount of switches that need to be purchased.

== Drawbacks ==
Flat networks provide some drawbacks, including:

- Poor security – Because traffic travels through one switch, it is not possible to segment the networks into sections and prevent users from accessing certain parts of the network. It is easier for hackers to intercept data on the network.
- No redundancy – Since there is usually one switch, or a few devices, it is possible for the switch to fail. Since there is no alternative path, the network will become inaccessible and computers may lose connectivity.
- Scalability and speed – Connecting all the devices to one central switch, either directly or through hubs, increases the potential for collisions (due to hubs), reduced speed at which the data can be transmitted and additional time for the central switch to process the data. It also scales badly and increases the chance of the network failing if excessive hubs are used and there are not enough switches to control the flow of the data through the network.
