= Martin P. Loeb =

Academic background
- Education: Northwestern University, Kellogg School of Management, State University of New York

Academic work
- Discipline: Accounting, Economics, Information Security
- Institutions: University of Maryland, College Park, Robert H. Smith School of Business

'Martin P. Loeb’ is an Emeritus Professor of Accounting and Information Assurance (AIA) at the Robert H. Smith School of Business at the University of Maryland, College Park. Loeb received his Ph.D. from the Managerial Economics and Decision Sciences (MEDS) group at Northwestern University's Kellogg School of Management. He received his BS in mathematics and economics from Stony Brook University.

Loeb's research interests span a number of economic and business fields. In his early career, he conducted research on economic mechanism design, incentive regulation, cost allocations, and cost-based procurement contracting. His research papers in those areas have been published in leading academic journals such as American Economic Review, Journal of Accounting Research, Journal of Law and Economics, Journal of Public Economics, Management Science, and The Accounting Review. More recently, his research focuses on economic aspects of information security, the interface between managerial accounting and information technology, and the effect of regulation on cyber security. His papers in these areas have been published in such journals as ACM Transactions on Information and System Security, Communications of the ACM, Journal of Accounting and Public Policy, Journal of Computer Security, and MIS Quarterly. Together with Lawrence A. Gordon, he developed a model that provides a mathematical economic approach for deriving an organization's optimal investment level in cybersecurity. That model, which has become known as the Gordon–Loeb model, has been featured in The Wall Street Journal and The Financial Times. Gordon and Loeb also co-authored Managing Cybersecurity Resources: A Cost-Benefit Analysis, a book providing a more extensive guide for managers facing the tradeoffs related to information security investments. Loeb's scholarly work has garnered well over 13,000 Google Scholar citations.

Loeb has also served in a number of editorial roles in the profession. He served as an editor of Journal of Accounting and Public Policy, and has served as a guest editor for MIS Quarterly and the Journal of Information Systems Frontiers. Loeb has also served on the editorial boards of The Accounting Review, The British Accounting Review, Journal of Business Finance and Accounting, and Review of Accounting Studies.

Loeb served as the Chair of the AIA Department for over a decade. The Wall Street Journal (Recruiter Survey) ranked the School's accounting program #7 in the United States. In 2015, the Financial Times ranked the doctoral program at the University of Maryland's Robert H. Smith School of Business #9 in the world.
