= Dynamic application security testing =

Testing process to determine security weaknesses

Dynamic application security testing (DAST) represents a non-functional testing process to identify security weaknesses and vulnerabilities in an application. This testing process can be carried out either manually or by using automated tools. Manual assessment of an application involves human intervention to identify the security flaws which might slip from an automated tool. Usually business logic errors, race condition checks, and certain zero-day vulnerabilities can only be identified using manual assessments.

On the other side, a DAST tool is a program which communicates with a web application through the web front-end in order to identify potential security vulnerabilities in the web application and architectural weaknesses. It performs a black-box test. Unlike static application security testing tools, DAST tools do not have access to the source code and therefore detect vulnerabilities by actually performing attacks.

DAST tools allow sophisticated scans, detecting vulnerabilities with minimal user interactions once configured with host name, crawling parameters and authentication credentials. These tools will attempt to detect vulnerabilities in query strings, headers, fragments, verbs (GET/POST/PUT) and DOM injection.

== Overview ==
DAST tools facilitate the automated review of a web application with the express purpose of discovering security vulnerabilities and are required to comply with various regulatory requirements. Web application scanners can look for a wide variety of vulnerabilities, such as input/output validation: (e.g. cross-site scripting and SQL injection), specific application problems and server configuration mistakes.

== Commercial and open-source scanners ==
Commercial scanners are a category of web-assessment tools which need to be purchased. Some scanners include some free features but most need to be bought for full access to the tool's power.

Open-source scanners are often free of cost to the user.

=== Strengths ===
These tools can detect vulnerabilities of the finalized release candidate versions prior to shipping. Scanners simulate a malicious user by attacking and probing, identifying results which are not part of the expected result set, allowing for a realistic attack simulation. The big advantage of these types of tools are that they can scan year-round to be constantly searching for vulnerabilities. With new vulnerabilities being discovered regularly this allows companies to find and patch vulnerabilities before they can become exploited.

As a dynamic testing tool, web scanners are not language-dependent. A web application scanner is able to scan engine-driven web applications. Attackers use the same tools, so if the tools can find a vulnerability, so can attackers.

=== Weaknesses ===
While scanning with a DAST tool, data may be overwritten or malicious payloads injected into the subject site. Sites should be scanned in a production-like but non-production environment to ensure accurate results while protecting the data in the production environment.

Because the tool is implementing a dynamic testing method, it cannot cover 100% of the source code of the application and then, the application itself. The penetration tester should look at the coverage of the web application or of its attack surface to know if the tool was configured correctly or was able to understand the web application.

The tool cannot implement all variants of attacks for a given vulnerability. So the tools generally have a predefined list of attacks and do not generate the attack payloads depending on the tested web application. Some tools are also quite limited in their understanding of the behavior of applications with dynamic content such as JavaScript and Flash.

== See also ==
- Security testing
- Static application security testing
- Interactive application security testing
