= Security through obscurity =

Reliance on design or implementation secrecy for security

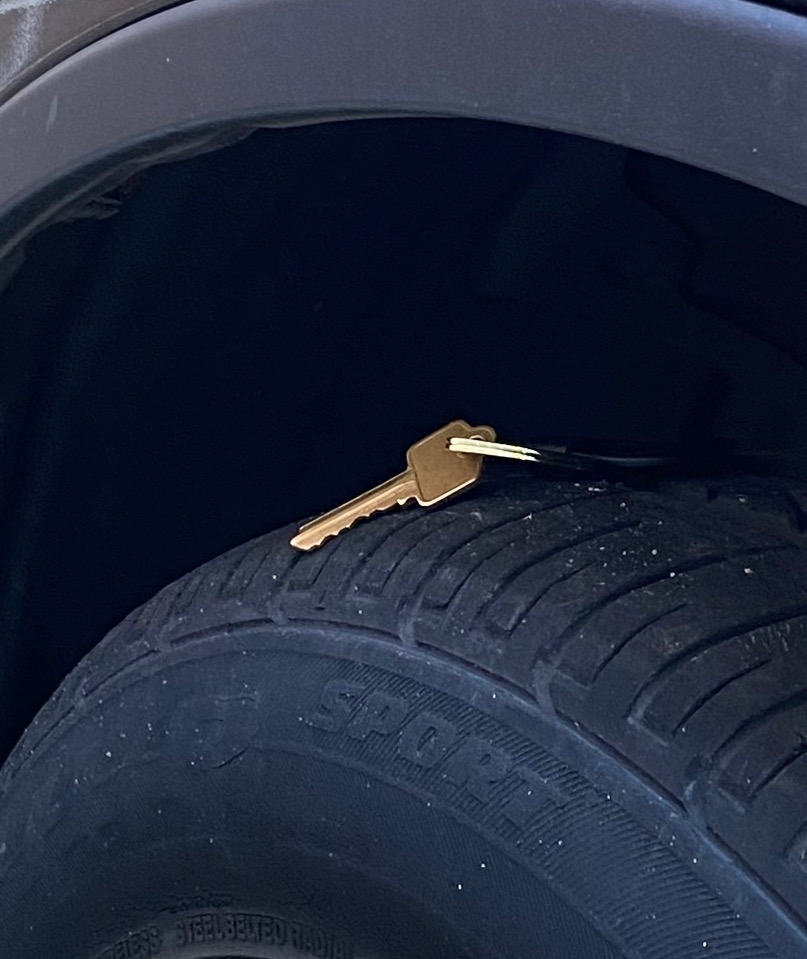
Security through obscurity is generally considered insufficient and not to be used as the only security feature of a system.

In security engineering, security through obscurity is the practice of concealing the details or mechanisms of a system to enhance its security. This approach relies on the principle of hiding something in plain sight, akin to a magician's sleight of hand or the use of camouflage. It diverges from traditional security methods, such as physical locks, and is more about obscuring information or characteristics to deter potential threats. Examples of this practice include disguising sensitive information within commonplace items, like a piece of paper in a book, or altering digital footprints, such as spoofing a web browser's version number. While not a standalone solution, security through obscurity can complement other security measures in certain scenarios.

Obscurity in the context of security engineering is the notion that information can be protected, to a certain extent, when it is difficult to access or comprehend. This concept hinges on the principle of making the details or workings of a system less visible or understandable, thereby reducing the likelihood of unauthorized access or manipulation.

Security by obscurity alone is discouraged and not recommended by standards bodies.

== History ==
An early opponent of security through obscurity was the locksmith Alfred Charles Hobbs, who in 1851 demonstrated to the public how state-of-the-art locks could be picked. In response to concerns that exposing security flaws in the design of locks could make them more vulnerable to criminals, he said: "Rogues are very keen in their profession, and know already much more than we can teach them."

There is scant formal literature on the issue of security through obscurity. Books on security engineering cite Kerckhoffs' doctrine from 1883 if they cite anything at all. For example, in a discussion about secrecy and openness in nuclear command and control:

[T]he benefits of reducing the likelihood of an accidental war were considered to outweigh the possible benefits of secrecy. This is a modern reincarnation of Kerckhoffs' doctrine, first put forward in the nineteenth century, that the security of a system should depend on its key, not on its design remaining obscure.

Peter Swire has written about the trade-off between the notion that "security through obscurity is an illusion" and the military notion that "loose lips sink ships", as well as on how competition affects the incentives to disclose. Open-source software developers have the strongest incentive to disclose information, since transparency is their competitive advantage; for proprietary software developers, however, the competitive advantage lies in withholding information about vulnerabilities until a patch is developed (responsible disclosure policies). Government or military organizations have no goal of attracting customers and, accordingly, no incentive to disclose information; moreover, disclosure poses a direct threat to their reputation.

There are conflicting stories about the origin of this term. Fans of MIT's Incompatible Timesharing System (ITS) say it was coined in opposition to Multics users down the hall, for whom security was far more an issue than on ITS. Within the ITS culture, the term referred, self-mockingly, to the poor coverage of the documentation and obscurity of many commands, and to the attitude that by the time a tourist figured out how to make trouble he'd generally got over the urge to make it, because he felt part of the community. One instance of deliberate security through obscurity on ITS has been noted: the command to allow patching the running ITS system (altmode altmode control-R) echoed as $$^D. Typing Alt Alt Control+D set a flag that would prevent patching the system even if the user later got it right.

In January 2020, NPR reported that Democratic Party officials in Iowa declined to share information regarding the security of its caucus app, to "make sure we are not relaying information that could be used against us." Cybersecurity experts replied that "to withhold the technical details of its app doesn't do much to protect the system."

== Criticism ==
Security by obscurity alone is discouraged and not recommended by standards bodies. The National Institute of Standards and Technology (NIST) in the United States recommends against this practice: "System security should not depend on the secrecy of the implementation or its components." The Common Weakness Enumeration project lists "Reliance on Security Through Obscurity" as CWE-656.

A large number of telecommunication and digital rights management cryptosystems use security through obscurity, but have ultimately been broken. These include components of GSM, GMR encryption, GPRS encryption, a number of RFID encryption schemes, and most recently Terrestrial Trunked Radio (TETRA).

One of the largest proponents of security through obscurity commonly seen today is anti-malware software. What typically occurs with this single point of failure, however, is an arms race of attackers finding novel ways to avoid detection and defenders coming up with increasingly contrived but secret signatures to flag on.

The technique stands in contrast with security by design and open security, although many real-world projects include elements of all strategies.

== Obscurity in architecture and technique ==
Knowledge of how the system is built differs from concealment and camouflage. The effectiveness of obscurity in operations security depends on whether the obscurity lives on top of other good security practices, or if it is being used alone. When used as an independent layer, obscurity is considered a valid security tool.

In recent years, more advanced versions of "security through obscurity" have gained support as a methodology in cybersecurity through Moving Target Defense and cyber deception.

== See also ==
- AACS encryption key controversy
- Code morphing
- Code talker
- Concealment device
- Full disclosure (computer security)
- Need to know
- Obfuscation
  - Obfuscation (software)
- Secure by design
- Steganography
