= Michael Schroeder =

American computer scientist (born 1945)

Michael David Schroeder
- Born: 1945 (age 80–81); Richland, Washington
- Education: Washington State University; MIT
- Known for: Needham–Schroeder protocol
- Scientific career
- Doctoral advisor: Jerry Saltzer

Michael David Schroeder (born 1945) is an American computer scientist. His areas of research include computer security, distributed systems, and operating systems, and he is perhaps best known as the co-inventor of the Needham–Schroeder protocol. In 2001 he co-founded the Microsoft Research Silicon Valley lab and was the assistant managing director until the lab was disbanded in 2014.

== Early life and career ==
Schroeder was born in 1945 in Richland, Washington. He did his undergraduate work at Washington State University and went to graduate school at MIT, obtaining his PhD in 1972.

Starting in 1976 he has been on the MIT EECS department faculty, at Xerox PARC, and at the DEC Systems Research Center. At MIT he was involved with Multics, where his contributions included a seminal work on security architecture for shared information systems.

In 1977 Schroeder and Roger Needham designed a new (unclassified) computer network protocol for distributed authentication server using a Key Distribution Center (KDC). This idea eventually led to the Kerberos authentication scheme used by MIT's Project Athena.

He has also built Grapevine (a distributed system), the filesystem of Cedar, Topaz (a distributed OS), Autonet (a LAN), and Pachyderm (a web-based email system).

He is the co-author of The Protection of Information in Computer Systems.

== Awards ==
In 2004, he was inducted as a Fellow of the Association for Computing Machinery.

In 2006, ACM SIGSAC presented him with the Outstanding Innovations Award "for technical contributions to the field of computer and communication security that have had lasting impact in furthering or understanding the theory and/or development of commercial systems."

In 2007, NIST/NSA gave him the National Computer Systems Security Award. In 2008, ACM SIGOPS chose the paper Grapevine: An Exercise in Distributed Computing, which he coauthored, for a Hall of Fame Award "that recognizes the most influential operating systems papers in the peer-reviewed literature at least ten year old."

== Gilbert Munger ==
He is a leading expert on the American landscape painter Gilbert Munger (1837–1903), for whom he authors a web-based catalogue raisonné and archive of period documents. With J. Gray Sweeney of Arizona State University he wrote the book Gilbert Munger: Quest for Distinction (Afton Historical Society Press, 2003).
