= Security awareness =

Mindset for protecting organizational assets

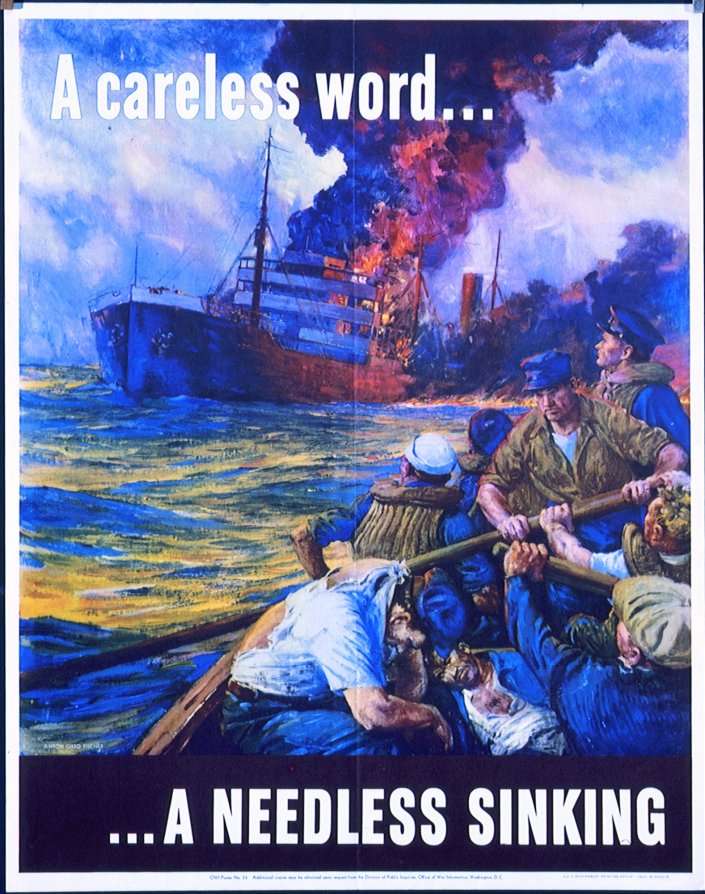
Security awareness poster from World War II.

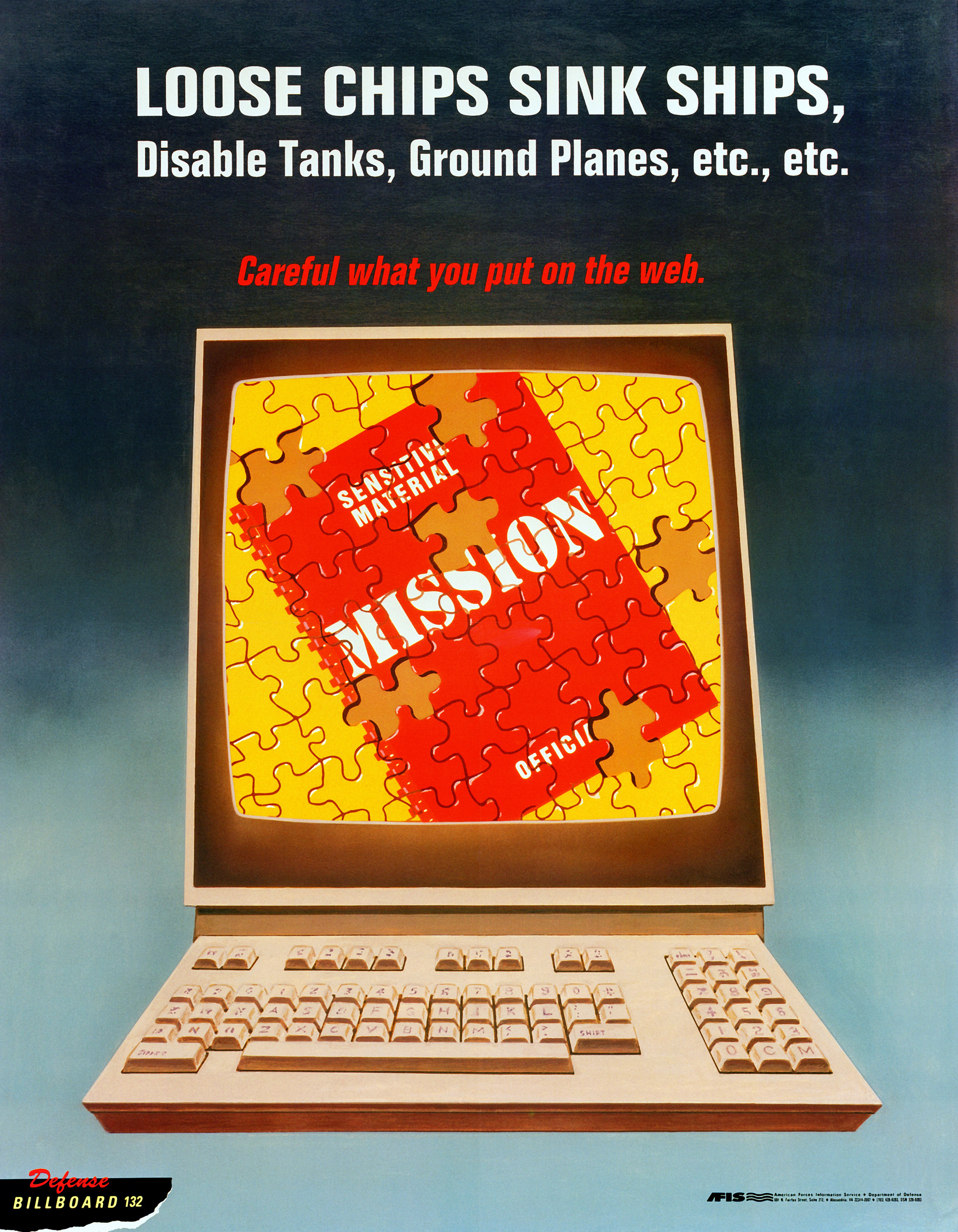
An equivalent 2000 warning about the web security awareness.

Security awareness is the knowledge and attitude members of an organization possess regarding the protection of the physical, and especially informational, assets of that organization. However, it is very tricky to implement because organizations are not able to impose such awareness directly on employees as there are no ways to explicitly monitor people's behavior. That being said, the literature does suggest several ways that such security awareness could be improved. Many organizations require formal security awareness training for all workers when they join the organization and periodically thereafter, usually annually. Another main force that is found to have a strong correlation with employees' security awareness is managerial security participation. It also bridges security awareness with other organizational aspects. Security awareness includes physical security, information security awareness, and Internet security awareness.

== Human factors ==
Employees' behavior, cognitive biases, and decision-making processes influence the effectiveness of security measures. Research indicates that psychological factors, such as optimism bias, overconfidence, and habitual behaviors, can undermine security awareness initiatives. To address these challenges, organizations are increasingly using behavioral analytics and security nudges—subtle prompts like password reminders and phishing warnings—to encourage secure behavior.

Human error remains the leading cause of cybersecurity incidents. A 2023 IBM Security report found that 95% of breaches are due to human mistakes, including falling for phishing emails, using weak passwords, and mishandling sensitive data. Organizations emphasize security awareness training as a key strategy to mitigate this risk.

It is particularly important for leadership to foster a culture of cybersecurity and to provide targeted training to increase security awareness among all employees across the organization.

== Training ==
Topics covered in security awareness training include:

- The nature of sensitive material and physical assets they may come in contact with, such as trade secrets, privacy concerns and government classified information
- Employee and contractor responsibilities in handling sensitive information, including review of employee nondisclosure agreements
- Requirements for proper handling of sensitive material in physical form, including marking, transmission, storage and destruction
- Proper methods for protecting sensitive information on computer systems, including password policy and use of two-factor authentication
- Other computer security concerns, including malware, phishing, social engineering, etc.
- Workplace security, including building access, wearing of security badges, reporting of Incidents, forbidden articles, etc.
- Consequences of failure to properly protect information, including potential loss of employment, economic consequences to the firm, damage to individuals whose private records are divulged, and possible civil and criminal penalties

Security awareness means understanding that there is the potential for some people to deliberately or accidentally steal, damage, or misuse the data that is stored within a company's computer systems and throughout its organization. Therefore, it would be prudent to support the assets of the institution (information, physical, and personal) by trying to stop that from happening.

According to the European Network and Information Security Agency, "Awareness of the risks and available safeguards is the first line of defence for the security of information systems and networks."

"The focus of Security Awareness consultancy should be to achieve a long term shift in the attitude of employees towards security, whilst promoting a cultural and behavioural change within an organisation. Security policies should be viewed as key enablers for the organisation, not as a series of rules restricting the efficient working of your business."

=== Gamification and interactive training ===
Modern security awareness programs increasingly utilize gamification, phishing simulations, and interactive learning modules. Studies have shown that engaging employees through serious games, reward systems, and real-world attack simulations improves retention and application of security practices. One example is phishing simulation training, where employees receive simulated phishing emails to test their ability to recognize threats. Research indicates that repeated exposure to such exercises leads to long-term improvements in security awareness.

== Compliance requirements ==
Many industries mandate security awareness training to comply with regulations such as:

- General Data Protection Regulation (GDPR) – requires organizations to ensure data protection awareness among employees.
- Health Insurance Portability and Accountability Act (HIPAA) – mandates security awareness programs for healthcare providers.
- Payment Card Industry Data Security Standard (PCI-DSS) – enforces security training for businesses handling payment card information.

== Measurement ==
In a 2016 study, researchers developed a method of measuring security awareness. Specifically they measured "understanding about circumventing security protocols, disrupting the intended functions of systems or collecting valuable information, and not getting caught" (p. 38). The researchers created a method that could distinguish between experts and novices by having people organize different security scenarios into groups. Experts organized these scenarios based on centralized security themes where novices organized the scenarios based on superficial themes.

Security awareness is also assessed through real-time security metrics, such as tracking phishing click rates, password reuse tendencies, and policy adherence rates. Some organizations adopt continuous monitoring strategies, which may increase employee compliance if they are aware they are being monitored.

== Evolving threats ==
As cyber threats continue to evolve, security awareness programs must adapt to new attack vectors, such as AI-driven cyberattacks, deepfakes, and insider threats. ENISA's Threat Landscape report highlights the increasing prominence of these emerging threats, stressing the need for security measures that address both traditional attacks like ransomware and malware, as well as more sophisticated techniques such as Living Off Trusted Sites (LOTS) and advanced evasion methods used by cybercriminals.

== See also ==
- Access control
- Physical Security
- Security
- Security controls
- Security management
- ISO/IEC 27002
- Internet Security Awareness Training
