= Lawrence A. Gordon =

- Born: Lawrence A. Gordon
- Education: Rensselaer Polytechnic Institute; Ph.D., Managerial Economics
- Scientific career
- Fields: Managerial Accounting
- Thesis: The Economics of Information Security Investment
- Website: scholar.rhsmith.umd.edu/lgordon

Lawrence A. Gordon is the EY Alumni Professor of Managerial Accounting and Information Assurance at the University of Maryland’s Robert H. Smith School of Business. He is also an Affiliate Professor in the University of Maryland Institute for Advanced Computer Studies. Gordon earned his Ph.D. in Managerial Economics from Rensselaer Polytechnic Institute. Gordon's research focuses on such issues as economic aspects of information security (including cybersecurity or computer security), corporate performance measures, cost management systems, and capital investments. He is the author of approximately 100 articles.

He is the namesake of the Gordon-Loeb model.

== Bibliography ==
- Managerial Accounting: Concepts and Empirical Evidence (ISBN 0073198005)
- Managing Cybersecurity Resources: A Cost-Benefit Analysis (ISBN 0071452850)
- Improving Capital Budgeting: A Decision Support System Approach (ISBN 020104319X)
