= Security controls =

Protection measures for a system

Security controls, security measures or countermeasures are safeguards to avoid, detect, counteract, or minimize security risks to physical property, information, computer systems, or other assets. In the field of information security, such controls protect the confidentiality, integrity and availability of information.

Systems of controls can be referred to as frameworks or standards. Frameworks can enable an organization to manage security controls across different types of assets with consistency.

Security controls reduce the likelihood of any impacts of security incidents and protect the CIA triad for systems and data. Protecting the CIA triad helps organizations meet their responsibilities through consistent risk management of systems, assets, data, networks and physical infrastructures.

The definition of countermeasure is given in IETF RFC 2828 and CNSS Instruction No. 4009 dated 26 April 2010 by the Committee on National Security Systems. According to the Glossary by InfosecToday, the meaning of countermeasure is:

The deployment of a set of security services to protect against a security threat.

== Overview ==
A resource (both physical or logical) can have one or more vulnerabilities that can be exploited by a threat agent in a threat action. The result can potentially compromise the confidentiality, integrity or availability properties of these resources (potentially different than the vulnerable one) of the organization and other involved parties (customers, suppliers).
The so-called CIA triad is the basis of information security.

The attack can be active when it attempts to alter system resources or affect their operation: so it compromises integrity or availability. A "passive attack" attempts to learn or make use of information from the system but does not affect system resources, compromising confidentiality.

A threat is a potential for violation of security, which exists when there is a circumstance, capability, action, or event that could breach security and cause harm. That is, a threat is a possible danger enabling the exploitation of a vulnerability. A threat can be either "intentional" (i.e., intelligent; e.g., an individual cracker or a criminal organization) or "accidental" (e.g., the possibility of a computer malfunctioning, or the possibility of an "act of God" such as an earthquake, fire, or tornado).

A set of policies concerned with information security management, the information security management systems (ISMS), has been developed to manage, according to risk management principles, the countermeasures in order to accomplish to a security strategy set up following rules and regulations applicable in a country.

== Types of security controls ==
Security controls can be classified by various criteria. One approach is to classify controls by how/when/where they act relative to a security breach, sometimes termed as control types:

- Preventive controls are intended to prevent an incident from occurring e.g. by locking out unauthorized intruders; Sometimes known as firewalls or locked server rooms that restrict physical entry
- Detective controls are intended to identify, characterize, and log an incident e.g. isolating suspicious behavior from a malicious actor on a network or using network monitoring tolls to flag suspicious activity.;
- Compensating controls mitigate ongoing damages of an active incident, e.g. shutting down a system upon detecting malware
- After the event, corrective controls are intended to restore damage caused by the incident e.g. by recovering the organization to normal working status as efficiently as possible.

Security controls can also be classified according to the implementation of the control (sometimes termed control categories), for example:

- Physical controls - includes tangible items such as fences, doors, locks, CCTV systems and fire extinguishers;
- Procedural or administrative controls - e.g. incident response processes, management oversight, security awareness and training.
- Technical or logical controls - e.g. user authentication (login) and logical access controls, antivirus software, firewalls;
- Legal and regulatory or compliance controls - includes privacy laws, policies, regulations and clauses that help organizations handle and protect (e.g. HIPAA, GDPR).

These classifications help organizations build a well-designed, multi-layered defense strategy in which different layers help control and prevent threats as they occur.

== Physical controls ==
If a potential malicious actor has physical access to a computer system, they have a greater chance of inflicting harm upon it.

=== Electronic destruction devices ===
Devices such as a USB Killer may be used to damage or render completely unusable anything with a connection to the motherboard of a computer, such as a USB port, video port, Ethernet port, or serial port. Without proper protection, these devices may result in the destruction of ports, adapter cards, storage devices, RAM, motherboards, CPUs, or anything physically connected to the device attacked, such as monitors, flash drives, or wired switches. These types of devices can even be used to damage smartphones and cars, as well.

This threat can be mitigated by not installing or restricting physical access to easily accessible ports in situations where they are not necessary. A port-closing lock which permanently disables access to a port short of the actual port being disassembled. When it is necessary for a port to be accessible, an optocoupler can allow for a port to send and receive data to a computer or device without a direct electrical connection, preventing the computer or device from receiving any dangerous voltage from an external device.

=== Hard drives and storage ===
In an unsecured scenario, a malicious actor may steal or destroy storage devices such as hard drives or SSDs, resulting in the destruction or theft of valuable data.

If the data of a storage device is no longer necessary, data theft is best prevented against by physically destroying or shredding the storage device.

If the data of a storage device is in use and must be secured, one can use encryption to encrypt the contents of a storage device, or even encrypt the whole storage device save for the master boot record. The device can then be unlocked with a password, biometric authentication, a physical dongle, a network interchange, a one-time password, or any combination thereof. If this device is a boot drive, however, it must be unencrypted in a pre-boot environment so the operating system can be accessed. Striping, or breaking data into chunks stored upon multiple drives which must be assembled in order to access the data, is a possible solution to physical drive theft, provided that the drives are stored in multiple, individually secured locations, and are enough in number that no one drive can be used to piece together meaningful information.

Not to be neglected is the process of adding physical barriers to the storage devices themselves. Locked cases or physically hidden drives, with a limited number of personnel with knowledge and access to the keys or locations, may prove to be a good first line against physical theft.

== Control effectiveness and lifecycle ==
Security controls include both technical controls (such as access management and firewalls) and administrative controls (including policies and procedures).

An effective controls testing and verification process allows:

- Identifying safeguards that are protecting confidentiality, integrity, and availability of assets.
- Detailed overview of any security posture of the service.
- Contribution to any mitigation plans that may be prioritized for reducing risks arising because of any weaknesses or failures of controls

Steps for assessment:

Document security control implementation: securing infrastructure, configuring components, identifying & access management, security polices

Monitor & verify security controls: Usually manual or automated testing and it tests penetration, reviewing logs, vulnerability scanning, any surveys and interviews with staff, and more.

Reporting test results: Generating reports, metrics, trends

Controls are part of a risk treatment strategy applied after risk assessment and designing, building, operating, and changing them is a part of the lifecycle.

== Purpose in organizations ==
University IT policy states that “Using a set of standardized controls allows IT security to ensure all University and Medical Center areas are protected from threats.”

Controls in four basic categories: Computer Controls, Data Protection, Network Protections, User Authentication

Computer Controls: Organizations may implement email protection, endpoint detection & response, centralized patch management, and domain membership.

Data Protection: For protecting data organizations may equip full disk encryption and media destruction

Network Protection: Protecting the network is important for keeping information safe from unwanted users. Organizations may use flow monitoring, logging network & system activity, network border protections and prohibit firewall to be bypassed to reduce an attack.

User Authentication: Organizations may use two-factor authentication, may force users to change their passwords annually, have only authorized account management, and use a Local Admin Password Solution (LAPS).

== Information security standards and control frameworks ==
The ISO/IEC 27000 series standards promote good security practices and define frameworks or systems to structure the analysis and design for managing information security controls. The most recent version, ISO/IEC 27001;2022, released in October 2022, specifies 93 controls; some of the most well-known standards are outlined below.

=== International Standards Organization ===
ISO/IEC 27001:2022 was released in October 2022. All organizations certified to ISO 27001:2013 are obliged to transition to the new version of the Standard within 3 years (by October 2025).

The 2022 version of the Standard specifies 93 controls in 4 groups:

- A.5: Organisational controls
- A.6: People controls
- A.7: Physical controls
- A.8: Technological controls

It groups these controls into operational capabilities as follows:

- Governance
- Asset management
- Information protection
- Human resource security
- Physical security
- System and network security
- Application security
- Secure configuration
- Identity and access management
- Threat and vulnerability management
- Continuity
- Supplier relationships security
- Legal and compliance
- Information security event management; and
- Information security assurance

The previous version of the Standard, ISO/IEC 27001, specified 114 controls in 14 groups:

- A.5: Information security policies
- A.6: How information security is organised
- A.7: Human resources security - controls that are applied before, during, or after employment.
- A.8: Asset management
- A.9: Access controls and managing user access
- A.10: Cryptographic technology
- A.11: Physical security of the organisation's sites and equipment
- A.12: Operational security
- A.13: Secure communications and data transfer
- A.14: Secure acquisition, development, and support of information systems
- A.15: Security for suppliers and third parties
- A.16: Incident management
- A.17: Business continuity/disaster recovery (to the extent that it affects information security)
- A.18: Compliance - with internal requirements, such as policies, and with external requirements, such as laws.

=== U.S. Federal Government information security standards ===
The Federal Information Processing Standards (FIPS) apply to all US government agencies. However, certain national security systems, under the purview of the Committee on National Security Systems, are managed outside these standards.

Federal information Processing Standard 200 (FIPS 200), "Minimum Security Requirements for Federal Information and Information Systems," specifies the minimum security controls for federal information systems and the processes by which risk-based selection of security controls occurs. The catalog of minimum security controls is found in NIST Special Publication SP 800-53.

FIPS 200 identifies 17 broad control families:

- AC Access Control
- AT Awareness and Training
- AU Audit and Accountability
- CA Security Assessment and Authorization (historical abbreviation)
- CM Configuration Management
- CP Contingency Planning
- IA Identification and Authentication
- IR Incident Response
- MA Maintenance
- MP Media Protection
- PE Physical and Environmental Protection
- PL Planning
- PS Personnel Security
- RA Risk Assessment
- SA System and Services Acquisition
- SC System and Communications Protection
- SI System and Information Integrity

National Institute of Standards and Technology

==== NIST Cybersecurity Framework ====
A maturity-based framework divided into five functional areas and approximately 100 individual controls in its "core", widely used by U.S. organizations and government agencies.

==== NIST SP-800-53 ====
A database of nearly one thousand technical controls grouped into families and cross-referenced.

- Starting with Revision 3 of 800-53, Program Management controls were identified. These controls are independent of the system controls, but are necessary for an effective security program.
- Starting with Revision 4 of 800-53, eight families of privacy controls were identified to align the security controls with the privacy expectations of federal law.
- Starting with Revision 5 of 800-53, the controls also address data privacy as defined by the NIST Data Privacy Framework.

=== Commercial Control Sets ===
==== COBIT5 ====
A proprietary control set published by ISACA.

- Governance of Enterprise IT
  - Evaluate, Direct and Monitor (EDM) – 5 processes
- Management of Enterprise IT
  - Align, Plan and Organise (APO) – 13 processes
  - Build, Acquire and Implement (BAI) – 10 processes
  - Deliver, Service and Support (DSS) – 6 processes
  - Monitor, Evaluate and Assess (MEA) - 3 processes

==== CIS Controls (CIS 18) ====
Formerly known as the SANS Critical Security Controls now officially called the CIS Critical Security Controls (CIS Controls). The CIS Controls are divided into 18 prioritized cybersecurity best practices that protect systems and data from threats.

- CIS Control 1: Inventory and Control of Enterprise Assets
- CIS Control 2: Inventory and Control of Software Assets
- CIS Control 3: Data Protection
- CIS Control 4: Secure Configuration of Enterprise Assets and Software
- CIS Control 5: Account Management
- CIS Control 6: Access Control Management
- CIS Control 7: Continuous Vulnerability Management
- CIS Control 8: Audit Log Management
- CIS Control 9: Email and Web Browser Protections
- CIS Control 10: Malware Defenses
- CIS Control 11: Data Recovery
- CIS Control 12: Network Infrastructure Management
- CIS Control 13: Network Monitoring and Defense
- CIS Control 14: Security Awareness and Skills Training
- CIS Control 15: Service Provider Management
- CIS Control 16: Application Software Security
- CIS Control 17: Incident Response Management
- CIS Control 18: Penetration Testing

The Controls are divided into Implementation Groups (IGs) which are recommended guidance to prioritize implementation of the CIS controls.

== Telecommunications ==
In telecommunications, security controls are defined as security services as part of the OSI model. These documents specify mechanisms such as authentication, access control, and data confidentiality to protect any network communications:

- ITU-T X.800 Recommendation.
- ISO ISO 7498-2

These are technically aligned. This model is widely recognized.

== Data liability (legal, regulatory, compliance) ==
The intersection of security risk and laws that set standards of care is where data liability is defined. A handful of databases are emerging to help risk managers research laws that define liability at the country, province/state, and local levels. In these control sets, compliance with relevant laws is the actual risk mitigator.

- Perkins Coie Security Breach Notification Chart: A set of articles (one per state) that define data breach notification requirements among US states.
- NCSL Security Breach Notification Laws: A list of US state statutes that define data breach notification requirements.
- ts jurisdiction: A commercial cybersecurity research platform with coverage of 380+ US State & Federal laws that impact cybersecurity before and after a breach. ts jurisdiction also maps to the NIST Cybersecurity Framework.

== Business control frameworks ==
There is a wide range of frameworks and standards looking at internal business and inter-business controls, including:

- SSAE 16
- ISAE 3402
- Payment Card Industry Data Security Standard
- Health Insurance Portability and Accountability Act
- COBIT 4/5
- CIS Top-20
- NIST Cybersecurity Framework

== See also ==
- Access control
- Anti–computer forensics
- Aviation security
- Common Vulnerabilities and Exposures (CVE)
- Common Vulnerability Scoring System (CVSS)
- Computer insecurity
- Computer security
- Countermeasure
- Defense in depth
- Environmental design
- Exploit (computer security)
- Full disclosure (computer security)
- Gordon–Loeb model for cyber security investments
- Information security
- IT risk
- Metasploit
- Month of Bugs
- Physical Security
- Risk
- Security engineering
- Security management
- Security services
- Security
- Vulnerability management
- w3af
