= Microsoft Security Development Lifecycle =

Software development process to improve security

The Microsoft Security Development Lifecycle (SDL) is the approach Microsoft uses to integrate security into DevOps processes (sometimes called a DevSecOps approach). The SDL guidance and documentation can be used to adapt these practices to other organizations.

== Overview ==
The practices outlined in the SDL approach are applicable to all types of software development and across all platforms, ranging from traditional waterfall methodologies to modern DevOps approaches. They can generally be applied to the following:

- Software – whether you are developing software code for firmware, AI applications, operating systems, drivers, IoT Devices, mobile device apps, web services, plug-ins or applets, hardware microcode, low-code/no-code apps, or other software formats. Note that most practices in the SDL are applicable to secure computer hardware development as well.
- Platforms – whether the software is running on a ‘serverless’ platform approach, on an on-premises server, a mobile device, a cloud hosted VM, a user endpoint, as part of a Software as a Service (SaaS) application, a cloud edge device, an IoT device, or anywhere else.

== Practices ==
The SDL recommends 10 security practices to incorporate into your development workflows. Applying the 10 security practices of SDL is an ongoing process of improvement so a key recommendation is to begin from some point and keep enhancing as you proceed. This continuous process involves changes to culture, strategy, processes, and technical controls as you embed security skills and practices into DevOps workflows.

The 10 SDL practices are:

1. Establish security standards, metrics, and governance
2. Require use of proven security features, languages, and frameworks
3. Perform security design review and threat modeling
4. Define and use cryptography standards
5. Secure the software supply chain
6. Secure the engineering environment
7. Perform security testing
8. Ensure operational platform security
9. Implement security monitoring and response
10. Provide security training

== Versions ==
Version	Release date	Link
1	January 2004	Unreleased
2	July 2004	Unreleased
2.1	January 2005	Unreleased
2.2	July 2005	Unreleased
3	January 2006	Unreleased
3.2	2008-04-15	http://www.microsoft.com/download/en/details.aspx?displaylang=en&id=24308
4.1	2009-06-01	http://www.microsoft.com/download/en/details.aspx?displaylang=en&id=15526
4.1a	2010-04-15	http://www.microsoft.com/download/en/details.aspx?displaylang=en&id=17701
5	2010-05-11	http://www.microsoft.com/download/en/details.aspx?displaylang=en&id=12285
5.2	2012-05-23	https://www.microsoft.com/en-us/download/details.aspx?id=29884
6	2024-05-21	https://www.microsoft.com/securityengineering/sdl

== See also ==
- Trusted computing base
