= Interactive application security testing =

Security testing method

Interactive application security testing (abbreviated as IAST) is a security testing method that detects software vulnerabilities by interaction with the program coupled with observation and sensors. The tool was launched by several application security companies. It is distinct from static application security testing, which does not interact with the program, and dynamic application security testing, which considers the program as a black box. It may be considered a mix of both.
