= Hiago Kin =

Brazilian cybersecurity consultant

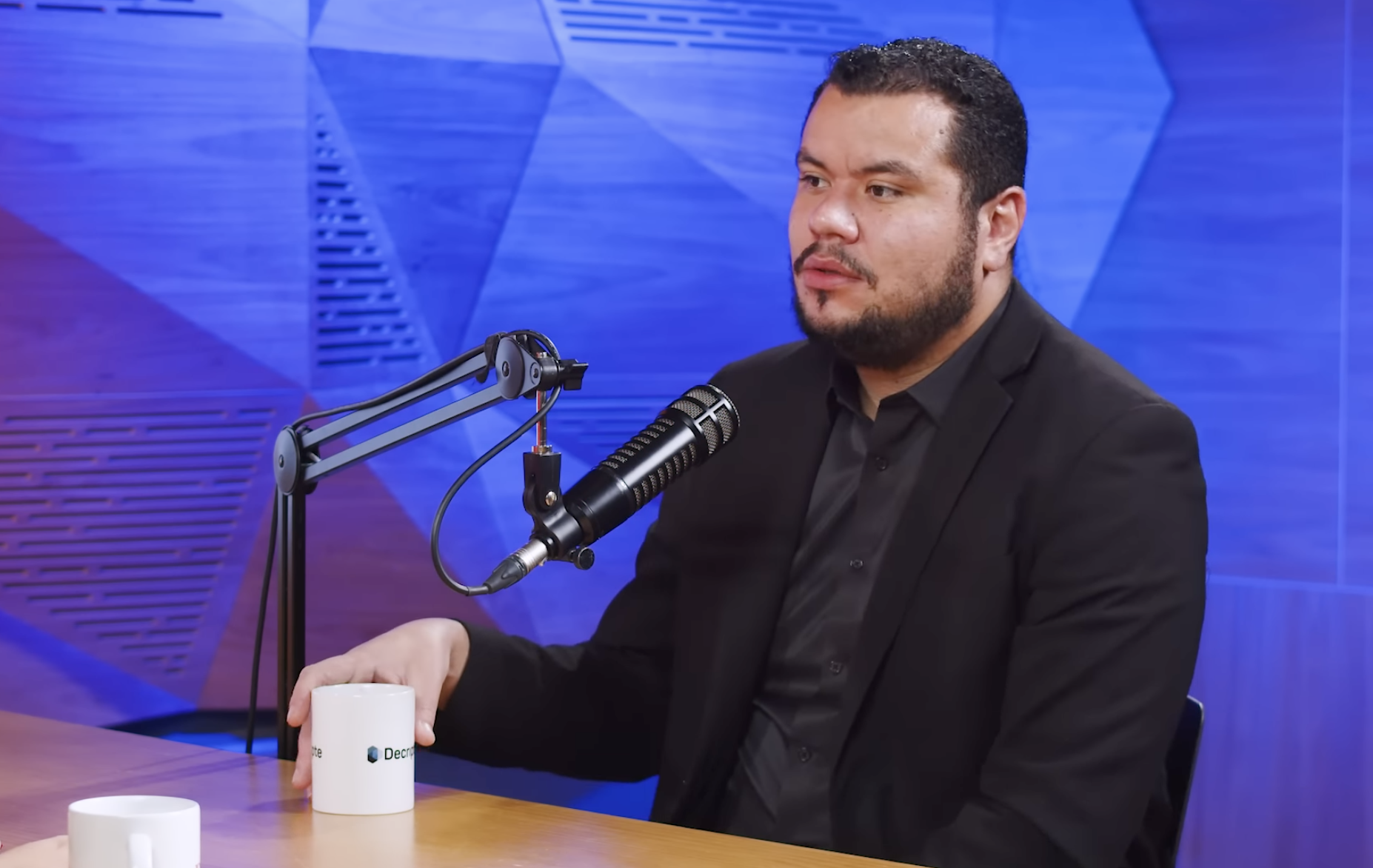
- Hiago Kin in an interview
- Born: Hiago Kin Levi Rodrigues; 13 October 1989 (age 36); São Paulo, Brazil
- Citizenship: Brazil
- Occupations: Cybersecurity consultant, entrepreneur
- Known for: Cyber-incident response

Hiago Kin (Hebrew name: יעקב בן לוי, Yaacov ben Levi) is a Brazilian cybersecurity consultant and entrepreneur. His work is associated with cyber-incident response in Brazil and with the organization of professional cybersecurity initiatives, including the Brazilian Cybersecurity Association (ABRASECI) and the Brazilian Cyber Incident Response Institute (IBRINC).

== Career ==
Hiago Kin has worked in information security since 2007. His public activity has included incident-response work, public technical guidance and educational writing on digital security topics, including automated collection of public data, social engineering, mobile-device theft, payment-system exposure and large-scale technology outages.

In 2020, Hiago Kin became president of ABRASECI, a Brazilian association of cybersecurity professionals. In 2025, IBRINC was established as a Brazilian research and incident-response institute focused on digital threats, technical response, professional training and support for organizations in the public and private sectors. Hiago Kin was subsequently identified as president of IBRINC in coverage of cyber incidents involving financial infrastructure and social engineering.

== Bibliography ==
- Brito, José Valmi (2023). O uso de dados pessoais pelo setor público e as administrações tributárias no contexto da LGPD (in Portuguese). Rio de Janeiro: Editora Dialética. doi:10.48021/978-65-252-6071-6. ISBN 9786525260716.
