= Deception =

Causing someone to believe something that is not true

Deception is the act of convincing one or many recipients of untrue information. The person creating the deception knows it to be false while the receiver of the information does not. It is often done for personal gain or advantage.

Deceit and dishonesty can also form grounds for civil litigation in tort, or contract law (where it is known as misrepresentation or fraudulent misrepresentation if deliberate), or give rise to criminal prosecution for fraud.

== Types ==
=== Communication ===
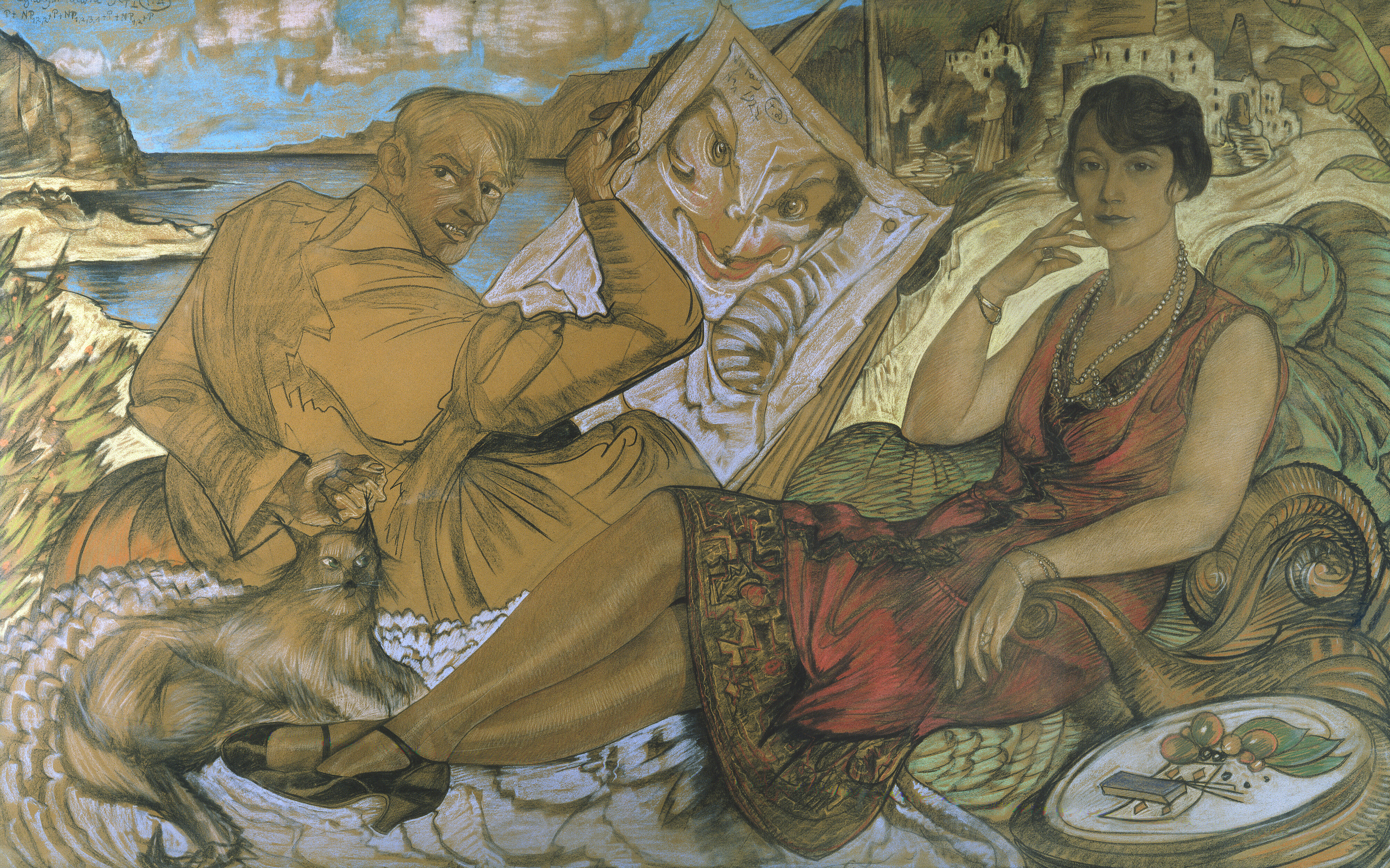
Deception of woman, with self-portrait by Stanisław Ignacy Witkiewicz, 1927 (National Museum, Warsaw)

The Interpersonal Deception Theory explores the interrelation between communicative context and sender and receiver cognitions and behaviors in deceptive exchanges.

Some forms of deception include:

- Lies: making up information or giving information that is the opposite or very different from the truth.
- Equivocations: making an indirect, ambiguous, or contradictory statement.
- Concealments: omitting information that is important or relevant to the given context, or engaging in behavior that helps hide relevant information.
- Exaggerations: overstatement or stretching the truth to a degree.
- Understatements: minimization or downplaying aspects of the truth.
- Untruths: misinterpreting the truth.

Buller and Burgoon (1996) have proposed three taxonomies to distinguish motivations for deception based on their Interpersonal Deception Theory:

- Instrumental: to avoid punishment or to protect resources
- Relational: to maintain relationships or bonds
- Identity: to preserve "face" or the self-image

=== Appearance ===
==== Mimicry ====
In the biological world, mimicry involves deception by similarity to another organism, or to a natural object. Animals for example may deceive predators or prey by visual, auditory or other means.

==== Camouflage ====
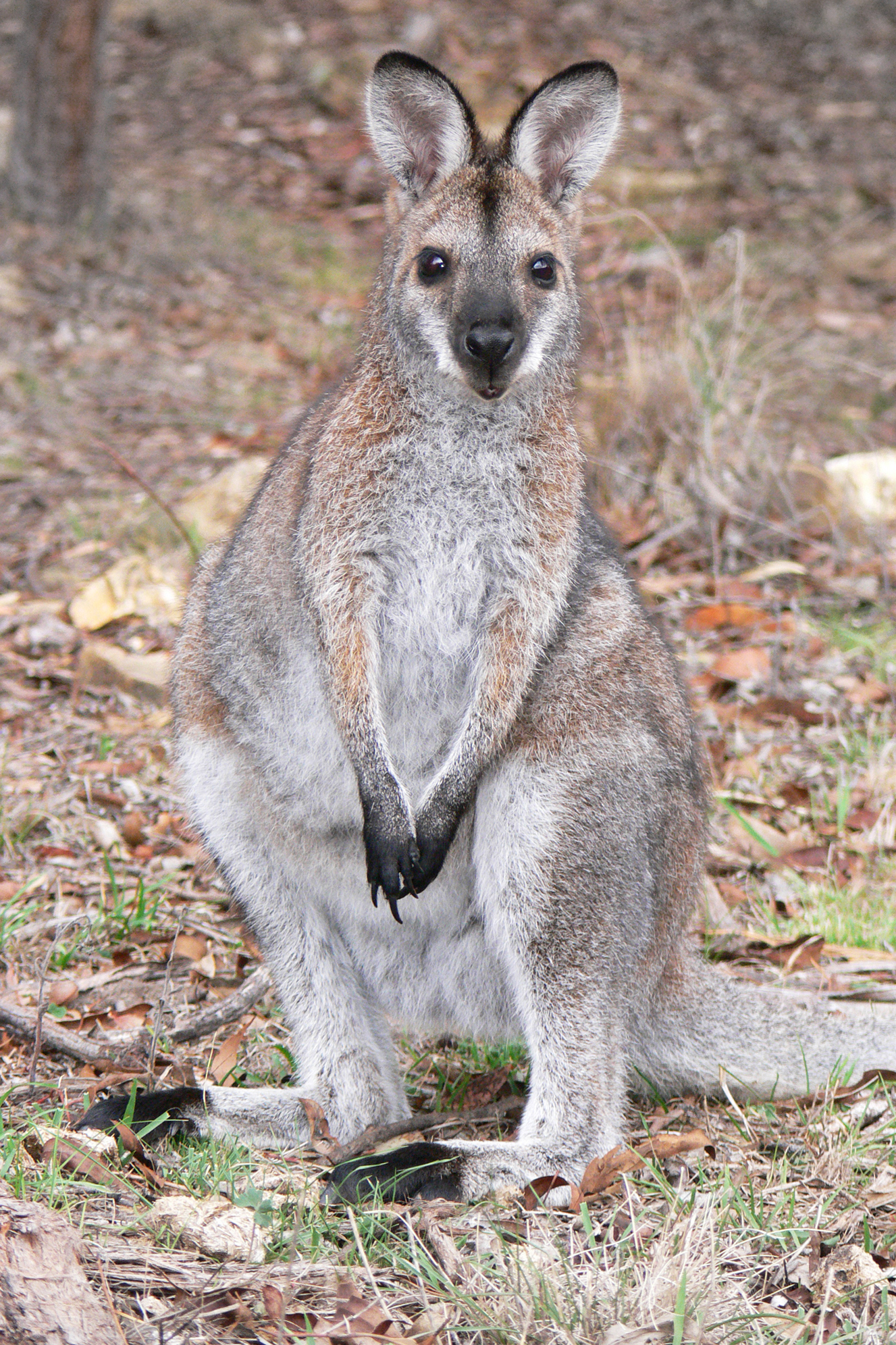
This wallaby has adaptive colouration which allows it to blend with its environment.

The camouflage of a physical object often works by breaking up the visual boundary of that object. This usually involves colouring the camouflaged object with the same colours as the background against which the object will be hidden.

Military camouflage as a form of visual deception is a part of many campaigns.

==== Disguise ====
Disguises are used to create the impression of a false appearance. A seventeenth-century story collection, Zhang Yingyu's The Book of Swindles (ca. 1617), offers multiple examples of the bait-and-switch and fraud techniques involving the stimulation of greed in Ming-dynasty China.

== In romantic relationships ==
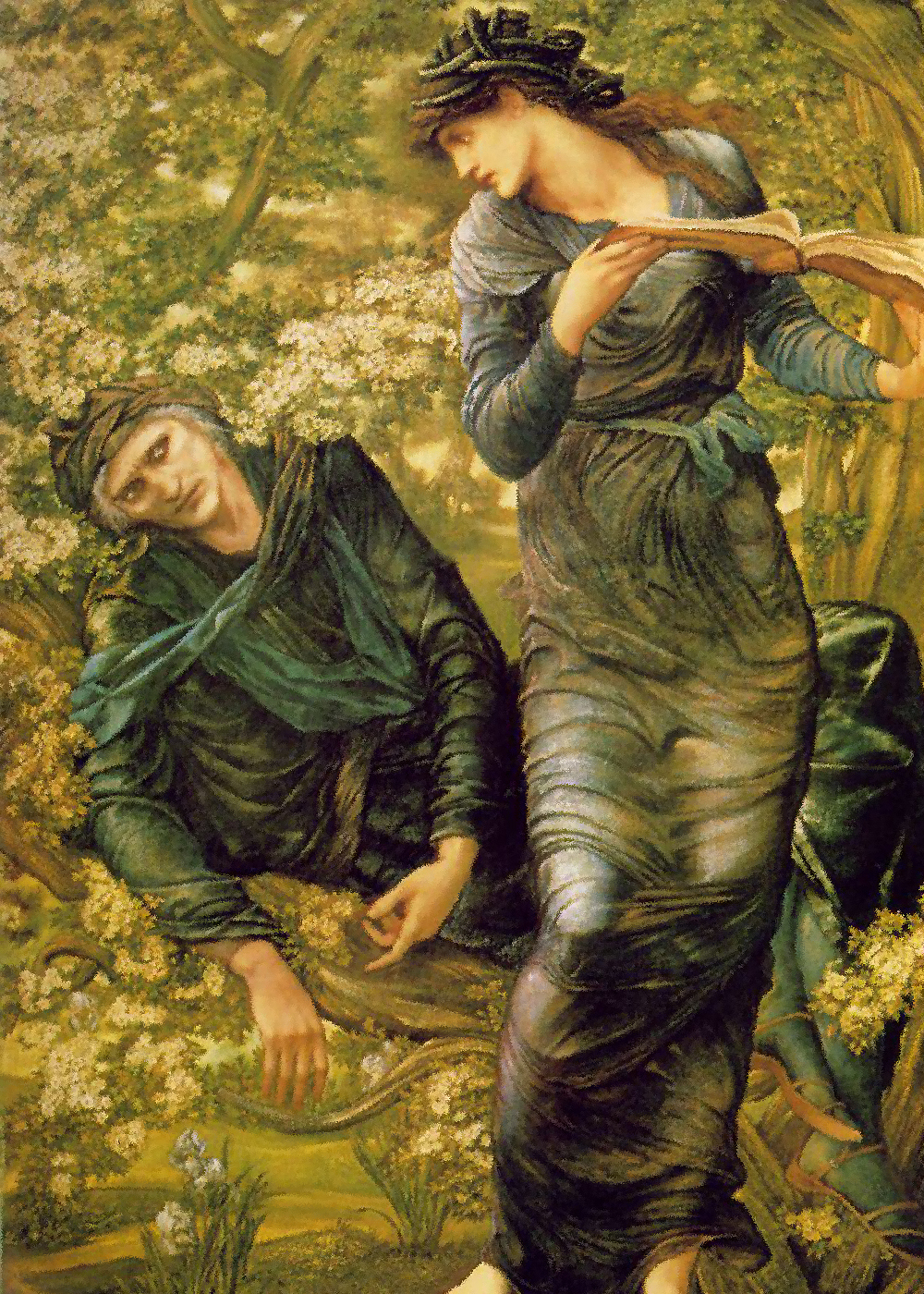
The Beguiling of Merlin, by Edward Burne-Jones, 1874

Deception has also been observed and studied in romantic relationships.

There are three primary motivations for deception in relationships.

Reasons for deceiving	Description
Partner-focused motives	Using deception to avoid hurting the partner, to help the partner to enhance or maintain their self-esteem, to avoid worrying the partner, and to protect the partner's relationship with a third party. Partner-focused motivated deception can sometimes be viewed as socially polite and relationally beneficial, such as telling white lies to avoid hurting your partner. Although other, less common, partner-focused motives such as using deception to evoke jealous reactions from their partner may have damaging effects on a relationship.
Self-focused motives	Using deception to enhance or protect one's own self-image, maintain or establish their autonomy, avoid constrictions, unwanted activities, or impositions, shield themselves from anger, embarrassment, or criticism, or resolve an argument. Another common self-focused motive for deception, is a continuation of deception to avoid being caught in a previous deception. Self-focused deception is generally perceived as a more serious transgression than partner-focused deception, because the deceiver is acting for selfish reasons rather than for the good of the partner or relationship.
Relationship-focused motives	Using deception to limit relationship harm by avoiding conflict or relational trauma. Relationally motivated deception can be beneficial to a relationship, and other times it can be harmful by further complicating matters. Deception may also be used to facilitate the dissolution of an unwanted relationship.

Deception impacts the perception of a relationship in a variety of ways, for both the deceiver and the deceived. The deceiver typically perceives less understanding and intimacy from the relationship, in that they see their partner as less empathetic and more distant. The act of deception can also result in feelings of distress for the deceiver, which become worse the longer the deceiver has known the deceived, as well as in longer-term relationships. Once discovered, deception creates feelings of detachment and uneasiness surrounding the relationship for both partners; this can eventually lead to both partners becoming more removed from the relationship or deterioration of the relationship. In general, discovery of deception can result in a decrease in relationship satisfaction and commitment level, however, in instances where a person is successfully deceived, relationship satisfaction can actually be positively impacted for the person deceived, since lies are typically used to make the other partner feel more positive about the relationship.

In general, deception tends to occur less often in relationships with higher satisfaction and commitment levels and in relationships where partners have known each other longer, such as long-term relationships and marriage. In comparison, deception is more likely to occur in casual relationships and in dating where commitment level and length of acquaintanceship is often much lower.

=== Deception and infidelity ===
Unique to exclusive romantic relationships is the use of deception in the form of infidelity. When it comes to the occurrence of infidelity, many individual difference factors can impact this behavior. Infidelity is impacted by attachment style, relationship satisfaction, executive function, sociosexual orientation, personality traits, and gender. Attachment style impacts the probability of infidelity and research indicates that people with an insecure attachment style (anxious or avoidant) are more likely to cheat compared to individuals with a secure attachment style, especially for avoidant men and anxious women. Insecure attachment styles are characterized by a lack of comfort within a romantic relationship resulting in a desire to be overly independent (avoidant attachment style) or a desire to be overly dependent on their partner in an unhealthy way (anxious attachment style). Those with an insecure attachment style are characterized by not believing that their romantic partner can/will support and comfort them in an effective way, either stemming from a negative belief regarding themselves (anxious attachment style) or a negative belief regarding romantic others (avoidant attachment style). Women are more likely to commit infidelity when they are emotionally unsatisfied with their relationship whereas men are more likely to commit infidelity if they are sexually unsatisfied with their current relationship. Women are more likely to commit emotional infidelity than men while men are more likely to commit sexual infidelity than women; however, these are not mutually exclusive categories as both men and women can and do engage in emotional or sexual infidelity.

Executive control is a part of executive functions that allows individuals to monitor and control their behavior through thinking about and managing their actions. The level of executive control that an individual possesses is impacted by development and experience and can be improved through training and practice. Those individuals who show a higher level of executive control can more easily influence/control their thoughts and behaviors in relation to potential threats to an ongoing relationship which can result in paying less attention to threats to the current relationship (other potential romantic mates). Sociosexual orientation is concerned with how freely individuals partake in casual sex outside of a committed relationship and their beliefs regarding how necessary it is to be in love to engage in sex with someone. Individuals with a less restrictive sociosexual orientation (more likely to partake in casual sex) are more likely to engage in infidelity. Individuals who have personality traits including (high) neuroticism, (low) agreeableness, and (low) conscientiousness are more likely to commit infidelity. Men are generally speculated to cheat more than women, but it is unclear if this is a result of socialization processes where it is more acceptable for men to cheat compared to women or due to an actual increase in this behavior for men. Research conducted by Conley and colleagues (2011) suggests that the reasoning behind these gender differences stems from the negative stigma associated with women who engage in casual sex and inferences about the sexual capability of the potential sexual partner. In their study, men and women were equally likely to accept a sexual proposal from an individual who was speculated to have a high level of sexual prowess. Additionally, women were just as likely as men to accept a casual sexual proposal when they did not anticipate being subjected to the negative stigma of sexually permissible women as slutty.

=== Online dating deceptions ===
Research on the use of deception in online dating has shown that people are generally truthful about themselves with the exception of physical attributes to appear more attractive. According to the Scientific American, "nine out of ten online daters will fib about their height, weight, or age" such that men were more likely to lie about height while women were more likely to lie about weight. In a study conducted by Toma and Hancock, "less attractive people were found to be more likely to have chosen a profile picture in which they were significantly more attractive than they were in everyday life". Both genders used this strategy in online dating profiles, but women more so than men. Additionally, less attractive people were more likely to have "lied about objective measures of physical attractiveness such as height and weight". In general, men are more likely to lie on dating profiles the one exception being that women are more likely to lie about weight.

== In business ==
People who negotiate feel more tempted to use deceit. In negotiation, it includes both parties trusting and respecting one another. In negotiations, one party is unaware of what is going on in the other side of the thing that needs to be negotiated. Deception in negotiation comes in many forms, and each has its reaction (Gaspar et al.,2019).

- Price reservation: Not stating the real budget or price that one has in mind.
- Misrepresentation of interests: Getting interests if the buyer seems desperate.
- Fabrication of facts: This is the most immoral part, where the person lies about materials and misleading information to get a sale.
- Omitting relevance: Not stating something helpful to know: for example, a car can be like new but it does not help if the seller omits the fact that there is a problem with the transmission.

== In journalism ==
Journalistic deception ranges from passive activities (i.e. blending into a civil rights march) to active deception (i.e. falsely identifying oneself over the telephone, getting hired as a worker at a mental hospital). Paul Braun says that the journalist does not stand apart from the rest of the populace in the use of deception.

== In interrogations ==
Deception can form an important part of effective interrogation. In the United States, there is no law or regulation that forbids the interrogator from lying about the strength of their case, from making misleading statements or from implying that the interviewee has already been implicated in the crime by someone else. See case law on trickery and deception (Frazier v. Cupp).

In 2021, Illinois became the first state to ban police officers from lying to minors during interrogations.

As noted above, traditionally the issue of deception is considered from the perspective of the interrogator engaging in deception towards the individual being interrogated. By the 2000s, information began appearing in research studies on effective interview methods used to gather information from individuals who score in the medium to high range on measures of psychopathology, and who exhibit deception with interrogators.

== In law ==
For legal purposes, deceit is a tort that occurs when a person makes a factual misrepresentation, knowing that it is false (or having no belief in its truth and being reckless as to whether it is true) and intending it to be relied on by the recipient, and the recipient acts to his or her detriment in reliance on it. Deceit may also be grounds for legal action in contract law (known as misrepresentation, or if deliberate, fraudulent misrepresentation), or a criminal prosecution, on the basis of fraud.

== In war ==
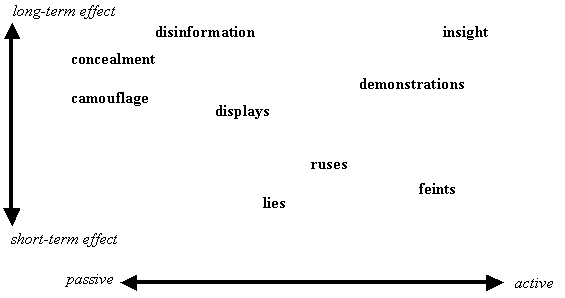
Spectrum of deception types, including: disinformation, concealment, camouflage, demonstrations, and feints.

Military deception (MILDEC) is an attempt by a military unit to gain an advantage during warfare by misleading adversary decision makers into taking action or inaction that creates favorable conditions for the deceiving force. This is usually achieved by creating or amplifying an artificial fog of war via psychological operations, information warfare, visual deception, or other methods. As a form of disinformation, it overlaps with psychological warfare. Military deception is also closely connected to operational security (OPSEC) in that OPSEC attempts to conceal from the adversary critical information about an organization's capabilities, activities, limitations, and intentions, or provide a plausible alternate explanation for the details the adversary can observe, while deception reveals false information in an effort to mislead the adversary.

Deception in warfare dates back to early history. The Art of War, an ancient Chinese military treatise, emphasizes the importance of deception as a way for outnumbered forces to defeat larger adversaries. Examples of deception in warfare can be found in ancient Egypt, Greece, and Rome, the Medieval Age, the Renaissance, and the European Colonial Era. Deception was employed during World War I and came into even greater prominence during World War II. In modern times, the militaries of several nations have evolved deception tactics, techniques and procedures into fully fledged doctrine.

== In religion ==
Deception is a common topic in religious discussions. Some sources focus on how religious texts deal with deception. But other sources focus on the deceptions created by the religions themselves. For example, Ryan McKnight is the founder of an organization called FaithLeaks. He stated that the organization's "goal is to reduce the amount of deception and untruths and unethical behaviors that exist in some facets of religion".

=== Judaism ===
The narrative concerning Jacob and Esau in the Book of Genesis recalls how Jacob, in concert with his mother Rebekah, deceived his aging and blind father, Isaac, causing Isaac to grant Jacob the blessing which was due to Esau, his elder brother.

=== Islam ===
In general, Islam never allows deception and lies. Prophet Muhammad said, "He who deceives is not of me (is not my follower)". However, there are some exceptions, especially in case of war or peace making or in case of safeguarding one's faith. For an example, Taqiya is an Islamic juridical term for the cases in which a Muslim is allowed to lie under the circumstances when needed to deny their faith due to force or when faced with persecution. The concept mainly followed by Shi'ite sect, but it varies "significantly among Islamic sects, scholars, countries, and political regimes", and has been evoked by critics of Islam to portray the faith allowing dishonesty.

== In psychological research ==
Though commonly used and allowed by the ethical guidelines of the American Psychological Association, there has been debate about whether or not the use of deception should be permitted in psychological research experiments. Those against deception object to the ethical and methodological issues involved in its use. Rebecca Dresser noted that, ethically, researchers are only to use subjects in an experiment after the subject has given informed consent. However, because of its very nature, a researcher conducting a deception experiment cannot reveal its true purpose to the subject, thereby making any consent given by a subject misinformed. Diana Baumrind, criticizing the use of deception in the 1963 Milgram obedience experiment, argued that deception experiments inappropriately take advantage of the implicit trust and obedience given by the subject when the subject volunteers to participate.

From a practical perspective, there are also methodological objections to deception. Andreas Ortmann and Ralph Hertwig noted that "deception can strongly affect the reputation of individual labs and the profession, thus contaminating the participant pool". If the subjects in the experiment are suspicious of the researcher, they are unlikely to behave as they normally would, and the researcher's control of the experiment is then compromised. Those who do not object to the use of deception note that there is always a constant struggle in balancing "the need for conducting research that may solve social problems and the necessity for preserving the dignity and rights of the research participant". They also note that, in some cases, using deception is the only way to obtain certain kinds of information, and that prohibiting all deception in research would "have the egregious consequence of preventing researchers from carrying out a wide range of important studies".

Some findings suggest that deception is not harmful to subjects. Larry Christensen's review of the literature found "that research participants do not perceive that they are harmed and do not seem to mind being misled". Furthermore, those participating in experiments involving deception "reported having enjoyed the experience more and perceived more educational benefit" than those who participated in non-deceptive experiments. Lastly, it has also been suggested that an unpleasant treatment used in a deception study or the unpleasant implications of the outcome of a deception study may be the underlying reason that a study using deception is perceived as unethical in nature, rather than the actual deception itself.

== In social research ==
Some methodologies in social research, especially in psychology, involve deception. The researchers purposely mislead or misinform the participants about the true nature of the experiment. In an experiment conducted by Stanley Milgram in 1963 the researchers told participants that they would be participating in a scientific study of memory and learning. In reality the study looked at the participants' willingness to obey commands, even when that involved inflicting pain upon another person. After the study, the subjects were informed of the true nature of the study, and steps were taken in order to ensure that the subjects left in a state of well-being.

== Online disinhibition ==
Through the internet, individuals can portray themselves however they please because of the lack of face-to-face communication. Digital deception is widely used within different forms of technology to misrepresent someone or something. Through digital deception, people are easily capable of deceiving others whether it be for their own benefit or to ensure their safety. One form of digital deception is catfishing. By creating a false identity catfishers deceive those online to build relationships, friendships, or connections without revealing who they truly are as a person. They do so by creating an entirely new account that has made-up information allowing them to portray themselves as a different person. Most lies and misinformation are spread commonly through emails and instant messaging since these messages are erased faster. Without face-to-face communication, it could be easier to deceive others, making it difficult to detect the truth from a lie. These unreliable cues allow digital deception to easily influence and mislead others.

=== "Dark patterns" ===
Web pop-up with dark patterns: 1. Fake urgency; 2. Offer of dubious value; 3. Fake social proof; 4. Obscure opt-out with confirm-shaming; 5. Hard-to-click preselected checkbox with trick wording

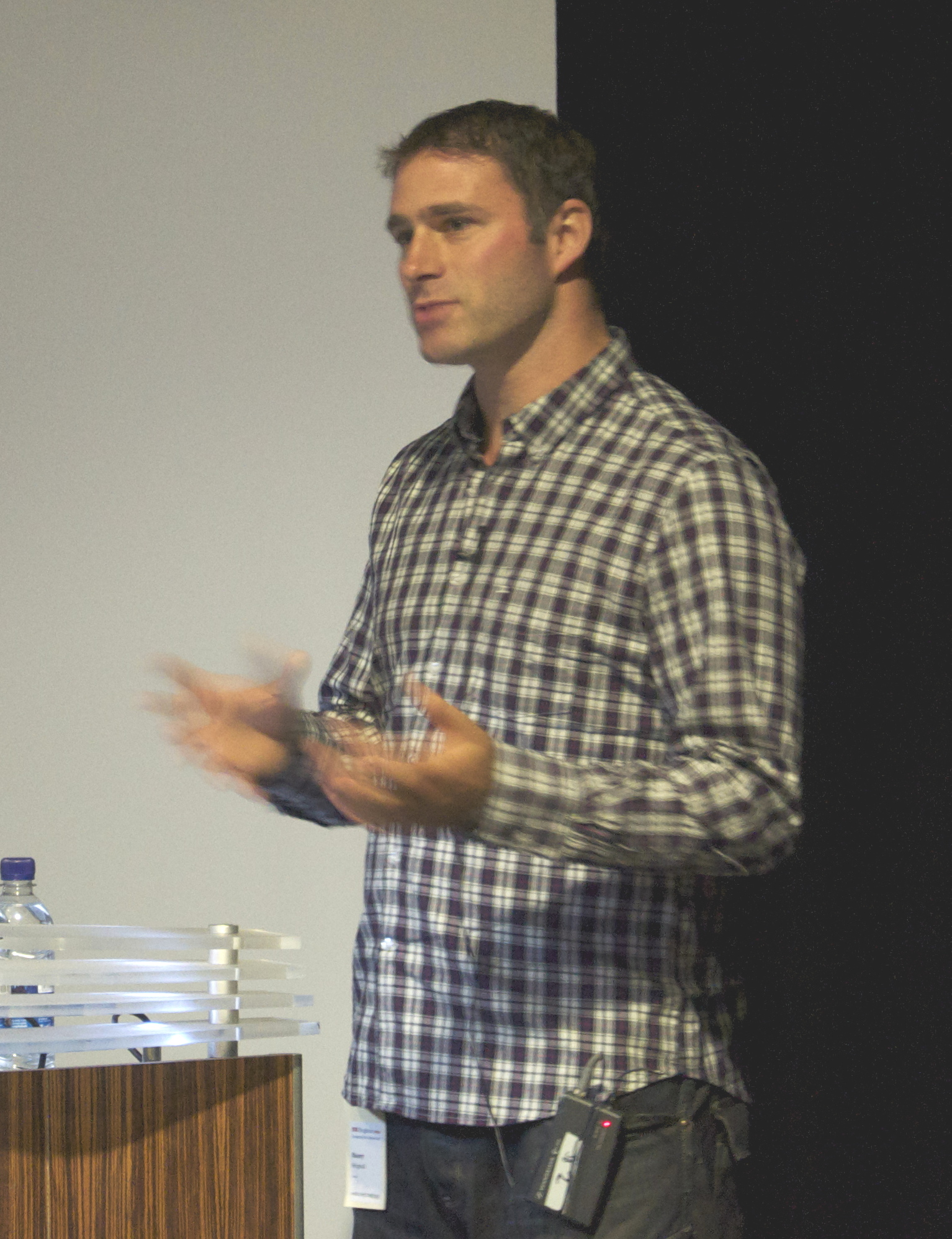
Harry Brignull in 2010

A dark pattern (also known as a "deceptive design pattern") is a user interface that has been carefully crafted to trick users into doing things, such as buying overpriced insurance with their purchase or signing up for recurring bills. User experience designer Harry Brignull coined the neologism on 28 July 2010 with the registration of darkpatterns.org, a "pattern library with the specific goal of naming and shaming deceptive user interfaces". The website has since moved to deceptive.design. In 2023, he released the book Deceptive Patterns.

In 2021, the Electronic Frontier Foundation and Consumer Reports created an online reporting form to collect information about dark patterns from the public.

== Double bluff ==
A double bluff is a form of deception in which a person tells the truth while acting as though they are lying, with the aim of tricking another into believing the opposite of what is said. In poker specifically, a double bluff is a situation in which the deceiving player is trying to bluff with bad cards, then gets re-raised by the opponent, and then re-raises again in the hopes that the enemy player folds. This strategy works best on opponents who easily fold under pressure.

== Deception detection ==
Deception detection is extremely difficult unless it is a blatant or obvious lie or contradicts something the other knows to be true. While it is difficult to deceive a person over a long period of time, deception often occurs in day-to-day conversations between relational partners. Detecting deception is difficult because there are no known completely reliable indicators of deception and because people often rely on a truth-default state. Deception, however, places a significant cognitive load on the deceiver. He or she must recall previous statements so that his or her story remains consistent and believable. As a result, deceivers often leak important information both verbally and nonverbally.

Deception and its detection are complex, fluid, and cognitive processes that are based on the context of the message exchange. The interpersonal deception theory posits that interpersonal deception is a dynamic, iterative process of mutual influence between a sender, who manipulates information to depart from the truth, and a receiver, who attempts to establish the validity of the message. A deceiver's actions are interrelated to the message receiver's actions. It is during this exchange that the deceiver will reveal verbal and nonverbal information about deceit. Some research has found that there are some cues that may be correlated with deceptive communication, but scholars frequently disagree about the effectiveness of many of these cues to serve as reliable indicators. A cross-cultural study conducted to analyze human behavior and deception concluded that detecting deception often has to do with the judgements of a person and how they interpret non-verbal cues. One's personality can influence these judgements also as some people are more confident in deceiving compared to others. Noted deception scholar Aldert Vrij even states that there is no nonverbal behavior that is uniquely associated with deception. As previously stated, a specific behavioral indicator of deception does not exist. There are, however, some nonverbal behaviors that have been found to be correlated with deception. Vrij found that examining a "cluster" of these cues was a significantly more reliable indicator of deception than examining a single cue.

Many people believe that they are good at deception, though this confidence is often misplaced. Deception detection can decrease with increased empathy. Emotion recognition training does not affect the ability to detect deception.

Mark Frank proposes that deception is detected at the cognitive level. Lying requires deliberate conscious behavior, so listening to speech and watching body language are important factors in detecting lies. If a response to a question has a lot of disturbances, less talking time, repeated words, and poor logical structure, then the person may be lying. Vocal cues such as frequency height and variation may also provide meaningful clues to deceit.

Fear specifically causes heightened arousal in liars, which manifests in more frequent blinking, pupil dilation, speech disturbances, and a higher-pitched voice. The liars who experience guilt have been shown to make attempts at putting distance between themselves and the deceptive communication, producing "nonimmediacy cues". These can be verbal or physical, including speaking in more indirect ways and showing an inability to maintain eye contact with their conversation partners. Another cue for detecting deceptive speech is the tone of the speech itself. Streeter, Krauss, Geller, Olson, and Apple (1977) have assessed that fear and anger, two emotions widely associated with deception, cause greater arousal than grief or indifference, and note that the amount of stress one feels is directly related to the frequency of the voice.

== See also ==
- Academic dishonesty
- Big lie
- Communications deception
- Deception in animals
- Electronic deception
- Evasion (ethics)
- Forgery
- Hoax
- Manipulation
