= Cybersecurity in space =

Cybersecurity in space involves the defense of all space assets (e.g. navigation systems, satellites, ground antennas, networks, etc.). The security of space can be affected by attacks such as disruption, corruption as well as the destruction of depended-upon assets/collected data.

Government (e.g. militaries) and non-government sectors (e.g. financial industries) have started to become more reliant on numerous space-based services. Due to the criticality of these services, space security experts have identified these assets as high-value targets (HVT) that can cause detrimental consequences to all of Earth.

== Scope and definitions ==
Space assets are broken down by three sub-sectors: the space component, the ground component, and the individual user component. The architecture of space assets is extremely complex and allows for a frequent attack vector utilized, the disruption by radio frequency (RF) cyber-attacks.

In 2020, a memorandum was published by President Donald Trump, Space Policy Directive‑5 (SPD‑5). It established principles to ensure the safeguarding of all space assets. In 2023, the National Institute of Standards and Technology’s (NIST) published IR 8270, Introduction to Cybersecurity for Commercial Satellite Operations. This report established a baseline risk-management framework (RMF) to be implemented into space operations.

== History ==
During the Cold War in the 1950s-1960s, the United States and Russia entered what was called the “Space Race”. By 1957, the Soviet Union successfully launched the first satellite into space named Sputnik. By 1961, the first key milestone was accomplished when the Soviet Union’s Yuri Gagarin became the first human to orbit Earth. This was later followed by the first American, Alan Shepard, to be launched into space; this was followed by John Glenn becoming the first American to orbit Earth in 1962. In 1969, a pinnacle milestone was reached when Apollo 11 launched into space and Neil Armstrong became the first man to walk on the moon.

As space operations furthered, Commercial off-the-shelf products became increasingly popular but resulted in a rapid increase to the cyber-attack surface. Public awareness of space security did not increase until 2022, when the Viasat KA-SAT incident occurred, resulting in the disruption of a large number of modems across Europe. The attack was later accredited to Russia by the U.S. and the U.K.

Policy and standards started to rapidly increase by 2020. The establishment of SPD-5 was released in 2020 followed by asset hardening instructions in 2022, and NIST’s IR 8270 in 2023. It was not until 2025 that Europe published their own findings in the Space Threat Landscape 2025 Report. This document led to the EU’s security proposals and standards.

== Threats ==
=== Radio-frequency Interference and Global Navigation Satellite Systems (GNSS) Spoofing ===
Space services are highly dependent on RF links for systems such as GNSS, however, a consequence of this dependency on RF is denial of service and deception. In 2017, the Black Sea maritime event occurred when numerous ships were subject to spoofing.

Space services depend on RF links susceptible to jamming (denial) and spoofing (deception), including for GNSS/Positioning, Navigation, and Timing (PNT). Annotated incidents include the 2017 Black Sea maritime spoofing event affecting numerous ships, and extensive aviation GNSS spoofing patterns surveyed in various regions during 2024–2025.

=== Network intrusion and malware ===
Cyber threats can intrude and infect assets with malware. They do this by finding misconfiguration vulnerabilities, remote-management interfaces, and/or supply-chain vulnerabilities mainly in ground networks and user terminals. When KA-SAT occurred, it resulted from bulk modem disturbances. Forensic analysts later suggested malicious management controls and wiper malware as the root cause.

=== Supply-chain and lifecycle risks ===
The outsource of COTS components, external vendors, and software defined payloads allowed for vulnerabilities to emerge in the System/Product Lifecycle. In response, EU recommended the implementation of lifecycle-wide controls as mitigating factors.

=== Espionage, disruption, and influence ===
As Advanced Persistent Threats (APTs), Global Positioning System (GPS) intervention, and information warfare increased, assets like transponders became more frequent targets of attack.

== Noteworthy incidents ==
The Viasat KA‑SAT incident of 2022, where a large number of modems in Europe were disrupted, resulted in the loss of telemetry access to a significant amount of wind turbines in Germany.

The mass GNSS deception of the Black Sea in 2017 affected numerous ships when they started to convey fake central locations in Russia.

Between 2024 and 2025, there was a mass, repetitive aviation GNSS spoofing that affected the aircraft of various regions.

== Standards, guidelines, and best practices ==
SPD‑5 (U.S.) – This established risk-based engineering, verifying and ensuring positive control, and the implementation of risk mitigation controls.

NIST IR 8270 – This created a RMF for COTS satellites.

CISA/FBI SATCOM Advisory (AA22‑076) – Provided guidance on hardening techniques such as least-privileged, access control, encryption, etc.).

ENISA Space Threat Landscape 2025 – It established the categorization of assets to organize threats, ensuring the observation of system/product lifecycle, and an RMF for COTS satellites.

ECSS‑E‑ST‑80C (2024) – This established a standard for securing lifecycles in space, covering all segments (e.g. ground, launch, etc.).

== Regulation and governance ==
As of 2025, there is no international regulations established for space assets, but the U.S., EU, and ESA institutional initiatives have published standards to address security concerns. The U.S. implemented SPD-5 and the Federal Communications Commission (FCC); the FCC addressed orbital debris. While the EU created standards to address technological mandates and support the implementation of NIS2. Lastly, the ESA created a special operations center to safeguard their satellites. International governance is still evolving, but forums have been held by the United Nations Committee on the Peaceful Uses of Outer Space.

International conversations under forums such as the UN Committee on the Peaceful Uses of Outer Space (COPUOS) progressively note the cyber–space safety relationship, though formal global norms specific to space cybersecurity continue evolving.

== Risk management approaches ==
Through RMF, mitigation controls have been implemented to reduce the risk of exploitation while increasing the security of space. Controls addressing mitigation include proper configuration, system hardening, zero-trust architectures, encryption, etc. Both the government and industries have placed an emphasis on incident response procedures to identify, contain, and remediate breaches.

== See also ==
- Anti-satellite weapon
- Cybersecurity
- Politics of outer space
- Russo-Ukrainian cyberwarfare
