= National Security Strategy =

National Security Strategy may refer to:

- National Security Strategy (India)
- National Security Strategy (United States)
- National Security Strategy (United Kingdom)
