= Rescator =

Ukrainian hacker

Rescator is the name of a Ukrainian hacker specialising in the sale of credit card details. According to Russian cyber-security consultancy Group-IB, "Rescator" (AKA Helkern and ikaikki) runs his own marketplace at rescator.cm and uploaded over 5 million card details onto the SWIPED carder marketplace.

== Overview ==
Credit card details have been stolen from places like Minnesota and the United Kingdom, the website allows searches by zip code so that stolen card numbers can be cashed out more locally to their victim to avoid alerting banks. Unlike the now defunct Tor Carding Forums, the site is free to use, payments requiring direct Bitcoin payments to sellers without escrow features more common on darknet markets. Many of the stolen details from the Target, Home Depot and Sally Beauty data breaches ended up at the site.

In March 2014, the site was briefly defaced by a rival hacker.
