= UK Cyber Security Forum =

The UK Cyber Security Forum is a social enterprise spanning the United Kingdom, representing small and medium-sized enterprises (SMEs) in the UK cyber sector. It is divided up into 20 regional cyber clusters which provide free membership and events for their members. It forms part of the UK cyber security community. The Forum has been praised by UK Government for helping to address the cyber skills gap faced by the U.K. The concept of providing regional cyber security clusters was then later supported and laid out by the U.K Government Cyber Security Strategy in late 2014.

National news has reported on the effectiveness of the forum, especially in terms of aiding collaboration between UK cyber companies. There has been considerable coverage of certain cyber clusters such as the London Cyber Cluster which has featured heavily in the media.

== The Cyber Clusters ==
There are currently 20 official cyber clusters in the U.K supported by the U.K Government.

Cyber Clusters
Bristol and Bath Cyber
Bournemouth Cyber Cluster
Cambridge Cyber Cluster
East Midlands Cyber Cluster
London Cyber Cluster
Malvern Cyber Cluster
Norfolk Cyber Cluster
North East Cyber Cluster
North Wales Cyber Cluster
North West Cyber Cluster
N Somerset Cyber Cluster
Oxford Cyber Cluster
Scottish Cyber Cluster
Solent Cyber Cluster (Southampton)
South Wales Cyber Cluster
South West Cyber Cluster (Exeter)
Sussex Cyber Cluster (Brighton)
Thames Valley
West Midlands Cyber Cluster
Yorkshire Cyber Cluster
