= Willis Ware =

American computer scientist

HG Willis
- Willis Ware in 1962
- Born: August 31, 1920; Atlantic City, New Jersey
- Died: November 22, 2013 (aged 93); Santa Monica, California
- Education: B.S. in electrical engineering, University of Pennsylvania; M.S. in electrical engineering, MIT; Ph.D., Princeton University
- Known for: Privacy Act of 1974

Howard George Willis Ware (August 31, 1920 – November 22, 2013), popularly known as Willis Howard Ware was an American computer pioneer who co-developed the IAS machine that laid down the blueprint of the modern day computer in the late 20th century. He was also a pioneer of privacy rights, social critic of technology policy, and a founder in the field of computer security.

== Biography ==
As an undergraduate, Ware read electrical engineering at the Moore School of the University of Pennsylvania. He completed his master's degree in the same subject at MIT, in 1942.

During World War II, Ware worked for the Hazeltine Corporation (1942–1946) on classified military projects. After the war (1946–1951), he joined the Institute for Advanced Study at Princeton to work with John von Neumann on building an early computer. After completing his PhD there, he moved to North American Aviation (1951–1952), helped to move the aviation industry from punch-card machines to early computers, and in 1952 began teaching a class in computing at the UCLA Extension Division; it continued for 12 years. In 1952 he joined the RAND Corporation, where he stayed until 1992. He was an early design engineer on the RAND JOHNNIAC computer.

In 1961, he was the founding president of the American Federation of Information Processing Societies, an early technical computing society. Ware predicted that increased reliance on computers would create new privacy issues, and in 1972 he chaired the Department of Health, Education and Welfare's Special Advisory Committee on Automated Personal Data Systems, which developed policy recommendations including the Code of Fair Information Practice that significantly influenced the Privacy Act of 1974. He continued to study and write about privacy for many years.

Ware influenced many aspects of computing including the initiation and direction of one of the first computing courses, at UCLA and authored some of the first textbooks in the field of computer security. In addition, he chaired several influential studies, including one in 1967 that produced a groundbreaking and transformational report to the Defense Science Board for ARPA (now DARPA) that was known thereafter as "the Ware report". The European Union's Data Protection Directive was strongly influenced by his research.

Ware died at his home in Santa Monica, California in 2013.

== Professional activities ==
Ware was an active and influential member of many industry organizations including:

- Chair of the Institute of Radio Engineers (IRE) Group on Computers (1958 - 1959)
- Founding President of the American Federation of Information Processing Societies (1961)
- Chair of the Advisory Committee on Automated Personal Data Systems for the Department of Health, Education and Welfare (now HHS) (1972)
- Vice Chair of the IFIP TC 11 (1985-1994)
- Founding Chair of the Information System and Privacy Advisory Board (1987 - 1998)
- US Air Force Scientific Advisory Board
- NSA Scientific Advisory Board
- Member of the Electronic Privacy Information Center(EPIC) Advisory Board
- Member of the National Academy of Engineering

== Awards and honors ==
Fellowships

- National Fellow of Tau Beta Pi (1941-1942)
- Fellow of the AAAS
- Fellow of the IEEE
- Fellow of the IRE (1962)
- Fellow of the ACM (1994)

Awards

- Achievement Award, Los Angeles Chapter, IRE (1957)
- Distinguished Service Award, AMPS (1963)
- Computer Sciences Man of the Year, Data Processing Management Association (1975)
- USAF Exceptional Civilian Service Medal (1979)
- IEEE Centennial Medal (1984)
- Distinguished Service Award, AMPS (1986)
- IEEE Computer Pioneer Award (1993)
- NIST/NSA National Computer Systems Security Award (1989)
- IFIP Kristian Beckman Award (1999)
- Lifetime Achievement Award from the Electronic Privacy Information Center (2012)
- Inductee into the Cyber Security Hall of Fame (2013)

== Publications ==
Ware authored over 70 publications over the course of his professional career.

- RAND and the Information Evolution: A History in Essays and Vignettes - 2008
- Security in Computing - 2002 (foreword).
- The Cyber-Posture of the National Information Infrastructure - 1998
- New Vistas on Info-Systems Security - 1997
- Privacy and Security Policy Choices in a National Information Infrastructure Environment - 1996
- A Retrospective on the Criteria Movement - 1995
- Policy Considerations for Data Networks - 1994
- Privacy Dimensions of Medical Record Keeping - 1994
- Statement on Escrowed Key Proposals Presented to the Subcommittee on Technology, Environment, and Aviation, U.S. House of Representatives - 1994
- Cyberspace security and safety - 1993
- The new faces of privacy - 1993
- Perspectives on trusted computer systems - 1988
- Survivability Issues and USAFE Policy - 1988
- Computer security policy issues: from past toward the future - 1987
- A Perspective on the USAFE Collocated Operating Base System - 1986
- Emerging privacy issues - 1985
- Technological perspectives for air base communications - 1985
- Base communications issues for the 1980s - 1984
- Information and communications protection - 1984
- Information systems : the challenge of the future for the Air Force Communications Command - 1984
- Information Systems, Security, and Privacy - 1983
- Perspectives on Oversight Management of Software Development Projects - 1983
- Avionics software: where are we? - 1982
- Information Policy: Thoughts for the 80's - 1982
- Information technology, crime and the law - 1982
- Security, privacy, and national vulnerability - 1981
- A taxonomy for privacy - 1981
- Security and privacy in the 80s - 1980
- Computer security in civil government and industry - 1979
- Security Controls for Computer Systems: Report of Defense Science Board Task Force on Computer Security - 1979
- Computers and personal privacy - 1977
- Computer technology: for beffter or worse? - 1977
- Federal and state regulations concerning the privacy of health care data - 1977
- Privacy and patient rights - 1977
- Privacy—handling personal data - 1977
- Privacy Issues in the Private Sector - 1977
- Public policy aspects for an information age - 1977
- Testimony before the House Subcommittee on Communications hearings: impact of telecommunications technology on the right to privacy - 1977
- The Computer Resources Management Study - 1976
- Privacy and Security Issues in Information Systems - 1976
- Privacy aspects of health statistics - 1976
- Privacy Issues and the Private Sector. - 1976
- Project RAND and Air Force Decisionmaking - 1976
- State of the Privacy Act: An Overview of Technological and Social Science Developments. - 1976
- Testimony before the National Commission of Electronic Fund Transfers. - 1976
- The Computer Resource Management Study: Executive Summary - 1975
- Legislative Issues Surrounding the Confidentiality of Health Records. - 1975
- Privacy and Security in Computer Systems - 1975
- Privacy: The Private Sector and Society's Needs. - 1975
- Computer Privacy and Computer Security. - 1974
- A Proposed Strategy for the Acquisition of Avionics Equipment - 1974
- Remarks—Seminar for Directors of Academic Computing Services. - 1974
- Computers and Society: The Technological Setting. - 1973
- Computers, Personal Privacy and Human Choice. - 1973
- Data Banks, Privacy, and Society - 1973
- Records, Computers and the Rights of Citizens - 1973
- Testimony to the Assembly Committee on Efficiency and Cost Control. - 1973
- The Ultimate Computer. - 1972
- Computers in Society's Future. - 1971
- Limits in Computing Power. - 1971
- Computer Data Banks and Security Controls. - 1970
- On Limits in Computing Power. - 1969
- Testimony Before the Assembly Statewide Information Policy Committee. - 1969
- The Computer in Your Future - 1967
- Security and Privacy in Computer Systems. - 1967
- Future Computer Technology and Its Impact - 1966
- Johnniac Eulogy - 1966
- Soviet Cybernetics Technology: V. Soviet Process Control Computers. - 1965
- The Programmer in a Changing World. - 1963
- Soviet Cybernetics Technology: II. General Characteristics of Several Soviet Computers - 1963
- Soviet Cybernetics Technology: III, Programming Elements of the BESM, STRELA, Ural, M-3, and Kiev Computers. - 1963
- Soviet Cybernetics Technology: I. Soviet Cybernetics, 1959-1962. - 1963
- The Evolution of Concepts and Languages of Computing. - 1962
- Soviet Computer Technology - 1959 - 1960
- The History and Development of the Electronic Computer Project at the Institute for Advanced Study - 1953
- The Logical Principles of a New Kind of Binary Counter - 1953

== See also ==
- Data Protection Directive – European law inspired by Ware's research
- Information privacy law
- List of pioneers in computer science
