= National Security Strategy (India) =

National security policy

The National Security Strategy (NSS) of India has not been defined since its Independence in 1947. Framing an NSS has remained a major policy goal and challenge of successive Indian governments.

== Background ==
In 2007, a draft National Security Strategy was prepared by the Integrated Defence Staff, but was not approved by the Cabinet Committee of Security.

The Defence Planning Committee (DPC), a senior decision-making mechanism created In April 2018 by the Central Government of India, according to the notification issued by Indian Government the DPC, will have several mandates including a task to prepare a draft National Security Strategy for India.

In 2019, the Indian National Congress came out with a document 'India's National Security Strategy', also called the Hooda report, which was subsequently integrated into its manifesto.

In March 2021, Chief of Defence Staff General Bipin Rawat, at a talk at the College of Defence Management, stated that "some important steps that we need to take, include-- defining the national security strategy [...]."

The Defence Acquisition Procedure 2020 contains reference to the "National Security Strategy/Guidelines (as and when promulgated)".

== See also ==
- National Cyber Security Policy 2013
