= Hacking back =

Hacking method

Hacking back is a technique to counter cybercrime by hacking the computing devices of the attacker. The technique can be used by law enforcement agencies or the victim of the crime.

The effectiveness and ethics of hacking back are disputed.

The legality varies, however both participating parties can typically still be prosecuted for their crimes.

There was a bill proposed in 2017 to make this possible, ended consideration in 2019. In 2022 it reappeared.

== Official Title as Introduced: Active Cyber Defense Certainty Act ==
To amend title 18, United States Code, to provide a defense to prosecution for fraud and related activity in connection with computers for persons defending against unauthorized intrusions into their computers, and for other purposes. Namely, Section 4: Exclusion from prosecution for certain computer crimes for those taking active cyber defense measures.

The term ‘active cyber defense measure’— means any measure— undertaken by, or at the direction of, a defender; and consisting of accessing without authorization the computer of the attacker to the defender’s own network to gather information in order to— establish attribution of criminal activity to share with law enforcement and other United States Government agencies responsible for cybersecurity; disrupt continued unauthorized activity against the defender’s own network; or monitor the behavior of an attacker to assist in developing future intrusion prevention or cyber defense techniques.

The term ‘defender’ means a person or an entity that is a victim of a persistent unauthorized intrusion of the individual entity’s computer.

GENERALLY.— A defender who uses an active cyber defense measure under the preceding section must notify the FBI National Cyber Investigative Joint Task Force and receive a response from the FBI acknowledging receipt of the notification prior to using the measure.

REQUIRED INFORMATION.— Notification must include the type of cyber breach that the person or entity was a victim of, the intended target of the active cyber defense measure, the steps the defender plans to take to preserve evidence of the attacker’s criminal cyber intrusion, as well as the steps they plan to prevent damage to intermediary computers not under the ownership of the attacker and other information requested by the FBI to assist with oversight.
