= Communications deception =

Telecommunications concept

In telecommunications, the term communications deception has the following meanings:

1. Deliberate transmission, retransmission, or alteration of communications to mislead an adversary's interpretation of the communications.
2. Use of devices, operations, and techniques with the intent of confusing or misleading the user of a communications link or a navigation system.
