= List of Israelis by net worth =

Annual ranking by net worth by Forbes magazine

This is a ranking list of Israeli wealthy people. The following is based on the annual estimated wealth and assets assessment compiled and published by American business magazine Forbes. Thirty people's listed wealth exceeds US$1 billion; Forbes does not include all entrepreneurs and investors who have citizenship of the country.

According to Israeli daily newspaper Times of Israel, Israel has 41 billionaires as of 2025, which is one of the highest per capita rates in the world, at 6.7 billionaires for every million people. However, not all of them permanently reside in Israel. In shekel (₪) terms, Israel had 170 billionaires in the same year. Forbes also lists Israeli citizens living in other countries on its list.

== Methodology ==
Each year, Forbes employs a team of more than 50 reporters from a variety of countries to track the activity of the world's wealthiest individuals. Preliminary surveys are sent to those who may qualify for the list. According to Forbes, they received three types of responses—some people try to inflate their wealth, others cooperate but leave out details, and some refuse to answer any questions. Business deals are then scrutinized and estimates of valuable assets (land, homes, vehicles, artwork, etc.) are made. Interviews are conducted to vet the figures and improve the estimate of an individual's holdings. Finally, positions in a publicly traded stock are priced to market on a date roughly a month before publication. Privately held companies are priced by the prevailing price-to-sales or price-to-earnings ratios. Known debt is subtracted from assets to get a final estimate of an individual's estimated worth in United States dollars. Since stock prices fluctuate rapidly, an individual's true wealth and ranking at the time of publication may vary from their situation when the list was compiled.

Legend
Icon	Description
Steady	Has not changed from the previous year
▲	Has increased from the previous year
▼	Has decreased from the previous year

Family fortunes dispersed over a large number of relatives are included only if those individuals' holdings are worth more than a billion dollars. However, when a living individual has dispersed his or her wealth to immediate family members, it is included under a single listing provided that individual is still living. Royal families and dictators that have their wealth contingent on a position are always excluded from these lists.

== 2023 list ==
The thirty-six billionaires are listed as follows, including their Israel rank (R#) and world rank (W#), citizenship, age, net worth and source of wealth:

R#	W#	Name	Image	Citizenship	Age (y.o.)	Net worth (billions of USD)	Source of wealth	Ref.
1	35	Miriam Adelson		United States Israel	77	▲35 +US$7.5B	Hospitality, Conventions, Casino resorts	
2	86	Eyal Ofer		Israel	76	▲18.9 +US$3.5B	Zodiac Maritime, real estate, and shipping	
3	127	Idan Ofer		Israel	71	▲14 +US$3.5B	Israel Corporation, Ofer Brothers Group, drilling, and shipping	
4	153	Viatcheslav Moshe Kantor		Russia Israel United Kingdom	69	▲11.3 +US$6.7B	Fertilizer, real estate	
5	208	Roman Abramovich		Russia Israel Portugal	56	▲9.2 +US$2.3B	Steel, investments	
6	332	Dmitry Bukhman		Israel	41	▼7 -US$1.1B	Playrix	
6	332	Igor Bukhman		Israel	44	▼7 -US$1.1B	Playrix	
8	352	Yuri Milner		Israel	64	▼6.8 -US$0.5B	DST Global	
9	405	Stef Wertheimer & family		Israel	100	6.3	International Metalworking Companies	
10	425	Frank Lowy		Australia Israel	92	▼6 -US$0.8B	Investments	
11	455	Teddy Sagi		Israel; Cyprus	55	5.6	Playtech	
12	636	Patrick Drahi		Israel	59	▼4.3 -US$2.3B	Telecom	
13	659	Shari Arison		Israel; United States	69	▼4.2 -US$0.8B	Bank Hapoalim and Carnival Cruises	
14	699	Shaul Shani		Israel	70	4	Swarth Group	
15	766	Yitzhak Tshuva		Israel	78	3.7	El-Ad Group, Delek	
15	766	Yakir Gabay		Cyprus Israel	56	▼3.7 -US$0.5B	Real estate	
17	878	Arnon Milchan		Israel	81	▼3.3 -US$0.2B	Regency Enterprises	
17	878	Gil Shwed		Israel	58	▼3.3 -US$0.2B	Check Point	
19	1027	Michael Federmann & family		Israel	83	2.9	Elbit Systems, Dan Hotels	
20	1368	Oren Zeev		Israel; United States	62	▼2.2 -US$0.8B	Houzz, Audible (service), Chegg, TripActions, Tipalti	
20	1368	David Wertheim		Israel	67–68	▼2.2 -US$0.4B	Coca-Cola Israel	
20	1368	Shlomo Kramer		Israel	59–60	2.2	Check Point, Imperva	
20	1368	Mickey Boodaei		Israel	53–54	2.2	Imperva, Trusteer	
20	1368	Shmuel Harlap		Israel	80–81	2.2	Mobileye	
20	1368	Adam Neumann		Israel; United States	44	▲2.2 +US$0.8B	WeWork	
25	1804	Liora Ofer		Israel	72	▼1.6 -US$0.2B	Investments	
26	1905	Zadik Bino		Israel	81	▼1.5 -US$0.2B	First International Bank of Israel, Paz Oil Company	
26	1905	Mori Arkin		Israel	73	1.5	Arkin Holdings	
26	1905	Amnon Shashua		Israel	66	1.5	Mobileye	
29	2020	Marius Nacht		Israel	64	1.4	Software: Check Point	
30	2133	Ziv Aviram		Israel	66–67	▼1.3 -US$0.2B	Mobileye	
31	2259	Danna Azrieli		Israel; Canada	59	▼1.2 -US$0.3B	Azrieli Group	
31	2259	Dan Gertler		Israel	52	1.2	Dan Gertler International	
31	2259	Drorit Wertheim		Israel	67–68	▼1.2 -US$0.2B	Coca-Cola Israel	
34	2405	Shlomo Eliahu		Israel	90	▼1.1 -US$0.2B	Bank Leumi, Union Bank of Israel, and others	
35	2540	Morris Kahn		Israel	96	1	Golden Pages, Amdocs, Aurec Group, Coral World Ocean Park	
35	2540	Ihor Kolomoyskyi		Israel	63	1	PrivatBank	

== See also ==
- Forbes list of billionaires
- List of countries by the number of billionaires
