= Cato Networks =

Israeli network security company

Cato Networks Ltd.
- Type: Private
- Industry: Computer networking
- Founded: 2015; 11 years ago
- Founders: Shlomo Kramer; Gur Shatz
- Headquarters: Tel Aviv, Israel
- Key people: Shlomo Kramer, CEO
- Products: Secure Access Service Edge
- Number of employees: 1100 (2024)
- Website: catonetworks.com

Cato Networks Ltd. is a Tel Aviv, Israel-based network security company that develops Secure Access Service Edge (SASE) technology, which combines enterprise communication and security capabilities into a single cloud-based platform. The company was founded in 2015. After an October 2021 funding round, the company was a tech unicorn valued at $2.5 billion.

== History ==
Cato Networks was founded in 2015 in Tel Aviv, Israel, by Shlomo Kramer, co-founder of Checkpoint and Imperva, and Gur Shatz, a co-founder of networking company Incapsula. Cato was initially funded with a $20 million Series A from U.S. Venture Partners and Aspect Ventures. Kramer became CEO, and Shatz became president and COO. It secured a Series B round of $50 million in September 2016. The company officially launched in February 2016. Its first products were designed to protect customers' wide area network (WAN) connections and mobile devices with next-generation firewalling, URL filtering, application control, VPN access, and more services.

In June 2018, the company added threat hunting capabilities to its networking service. In 2019, the company secured a $55 million Series C funding round. In April 2020, the company raised $77 million in a Series D. In November, the company announced a $130 million Series E funding round, led by return investors Lightspeed Partners, with participation from Greylock Partners, U.S. Venture Partners, Aspect Capital, Singaporean fund Singtel's subsidiary Innov8, and hedge fund Coatue Management. The investment reportedly valued the company at over $1 billion, making it a tech unicorn.

In June 2021, the company launched a new version of its managed detection and response (MDR) platform, used to detect security threats on its network. In October, the company announced it had raised $200 million at a $2.5 billion valuation. The round was led by Lightspeed Venture Partners with the participation of existing investors Greylock, Acrew Capital, Coatue, Singtel Innov8, and CEO Kramer. In February 2022, the company added cloud access security broker (CASB) capabilities to protect cloud applications.

In September 2025, Cato Networks announced its first-ever M&A deal with the acquisition of Aim Security, an AI security startup based in Israel, in order to expand into the rapidly growing AI security segment. Included in this announcement were two other recent developments: that it had crossed the $300 million Annual Recurring Revenue (ARR) threshold; and that it had raised another $50 million in its Series G round, bringing the total to $409 million at an estimated valuation of over $4.8 billion.

== Products ==
Cato Networks develops a Secure Access Service Edge (SASE) platform, which combines SD-WAN, managed security service and global backbone services into a cloud-based service offering. Its products are designed to help IT staff manage network security for distributed workforces accessing resources across the wide area networks (WANs), cloud and Internet that connects them. The company's Cato SASE Cloud platform supports more than 73 points of presence in over 150 countries.
