= Altor Networks =

Computer security company

- Virtualize Securely
- Type: Private
- Industry: Virtual network security
- Founded: 2007
- Headquarters: Redwood Shores, California, United States
- Area served: Worldwide
- Key people: Amir Ben-Efraim, CEO
- Products: Virtual security appliance, virtual firewall
- Revenue: Not stated
- Net income: Not stated
- Number of employees: Around 50 (2010) in two countries

Altor Networks, Inc., a Juniper Networks company, is a provider of security for virtual data centers and clouds. The company developed the world's first firewall purpose-built for virtual networks, a software security "appliance" that runs in a virtualized environment and enforces security policy on a per-virtual-machine basis. Data center administrators could pinpoint a broad range of virtual network security compromises and create roles-based security policies. Security policies could be continuously enforced on individual virtual machines (VMs), even as they moved throughout the virtualized data center.

Headquartered in Redwood Shores, California, United States, Altor was founded in 2007 by security and networking experts from Check Point Software, Cisco and Oracle Corporation, and has received funding from Accel Partners, DAG Ventures, Foundation Capital, and Juniper Networks. On December 6, 2010, Juniper Networks announced it had acquired Altor Networks for $95 million in cash.

== Background ==
Computer virtualization has been in use on mainframe computers since the IBM VM/370 platform released in the early 1970s. VM technology became more widely available with the release of VMware Workstation in 1999, and the VMware Server line in 2001. It was estimated that 50% of workloads would be running inside virtualized environments by 2012

Whenever virtualization technology includes a hypervisor, then a virtual network can be created within the hypervisor layer to transparently network all the virtual machines operating under a single virtualized environment. This "virtual network" provides all the benefits and administrative responsibilities of a physical network, with the addition of some new challenges. The founders of Altor Networks became aware early on that adoption of virtualization technologies in data centers had been accelerating for many years and several problems in virtual network security in particular became apparent:

- The virtual environment had some unique security characteristics and needs;
- Those needs were not being addressed effectively by IT security vendors; and
- Traditional security technologies were ill-equipped to protect virtualized IT resources.

It was decided that the way to address these challenges was to provide a solution that operated entirely within the virtualized environment as a purpose-built appliance to provide firewalling and other security services directly inside the virtual network without recourse to external hardware firewalls or intrusion detection appliances, or any associated VLAN rerouting out of the virtual network to the physical network and back again.

== Products ==
Altor released the Virtual Network Security Analyzer (VNSA) as a tool to monitor and analyze virtual network traffic in March 2008, followed by the Altor VF 1.0 (which included the VNSA as a module) in October 2008. Integrated signature-based network intrusion detection was incorporated into the Altor VF 3.0 release in September 2009. The release of Altor VF 4.0 now leverages virtual machine introspection to bring visibility to internal virtual machine states for compliance assessment and automated security enforcement.

- Altor VNSA (Virtual Network Security Analyzer), released March 2008 (now part of Altor VF)
- Altor VF 1.0 (Altor Virtual Firewall), released October 2008
- Altor VF 2.0, released March 2009
- Altor VF 3.0, released September 2009
- Altor v4.0, released June 2010

Altor Networks offers a virtual security appliance for use within VMware ESX, with ongoing efforts to add support for Xen/Citrix and Microsoft HyperV/Viridian platforms.

== See also ==
- Mocana
- Lastline
