= Israeli cybersecurity industry =

The Israeli cybersecurity industry is a rapidly growing sector within Israel's technology and innovation ecosystem. Israel is internationally recognized as a powerhouse in the cybersecurity domain, with numerous cybersecurity startups, established companies, research institutions, and government initiatives. Tel Aviv itself is being ranked 7th in annual list of best global tech ecosystems, as reported by the Jerusalem Post.

== History ==
The roots of Israel's cybersecurity industry can be traced back to the country's strong focus on national security and intelligence. The establishment of elite military units such as Unit 8200, the Israeli Intelligence Corps unit responsible for signals intelligence and code decryption, played a significant role in the development of cybersecurity expertise in the country. Many former members of Unit 8200 have gone on to establish successful cybersecurity companies or join existing organizations, bringing their unique skill sets and experience to the private sector.

== Market overview ==
As of 2024, Israel housed more than 450 cybersecurity startups and companies. In 2023, the value of exits by Israeli tech companies reached $7.5 billion.

Israel's cybersecurity industry is characterized by a high concentration of startups that develop new technologies in areas such as network security, endpoint protection, data security, cloud security, and threat intelligence. In recent years, the sector has attracted significant investment from both local and international venture capital firms, as well as major technology companies such as Microsoft, Google, and IBM.

Several Israeli cybersecurity companies have gained global recognition and success, with some being acquired by major corporations or conducting successful initial public offerings (IPOs).

=== Key Israeli cybersecurity companies ===
Some key Israeli cybersecurity companies include:

- Check Point Software Technologies
- CyberArk
- Cato Networks
- Glow
- Radware
- Wiz

=== Financial activity ===
Israel’s cybersecurity sector has seen significant financial activity. As of 2023, mergers and acquisitions in the cybersecurity sector totaled $2.8 billion.

In the first quarter of 2024, the sector secured $846 million in private funding.

== Background ==
The military experience helped much. Israel's mandatory military service, combined with the expertise developed within elite units such as Unit 8200, has fostered a strong talent pool with practical experience in cybersecurity.

Israel's thriving startup ecosystem, often referred to as the "Startup Nation," has fostered an environment of innovation and collaboration that has contributed to the growth of the cybersecurity industry.

Israeli cybersecurity companies often collaborate with international partners, both in the private and public sectors, to share knowledge and develop joint solutions.

=== Government Initiatives and Support ===
The government also supported well through various initiatives, such as the Israel National Cyber Directorate (INCD), which works to strengthen cybersecurity defenses and promote the development of the sector.

=== Academic institutions ===
Israeli universities and research centers are involved in cybersecurity research and education, contributing to the development of new technologies and training the next generation of cybersecurity professionals.

Academic Tech transfer offices in Israel also facilitate the commercialization of cybersecurity technologies.

Some academic institutions with cybersecurity laboratories include:

- Tel Aviv University
- Technion
- Ben-Gurion University
