= Dorit Dor =

Israeli executive (born 1967)

- דורית דור
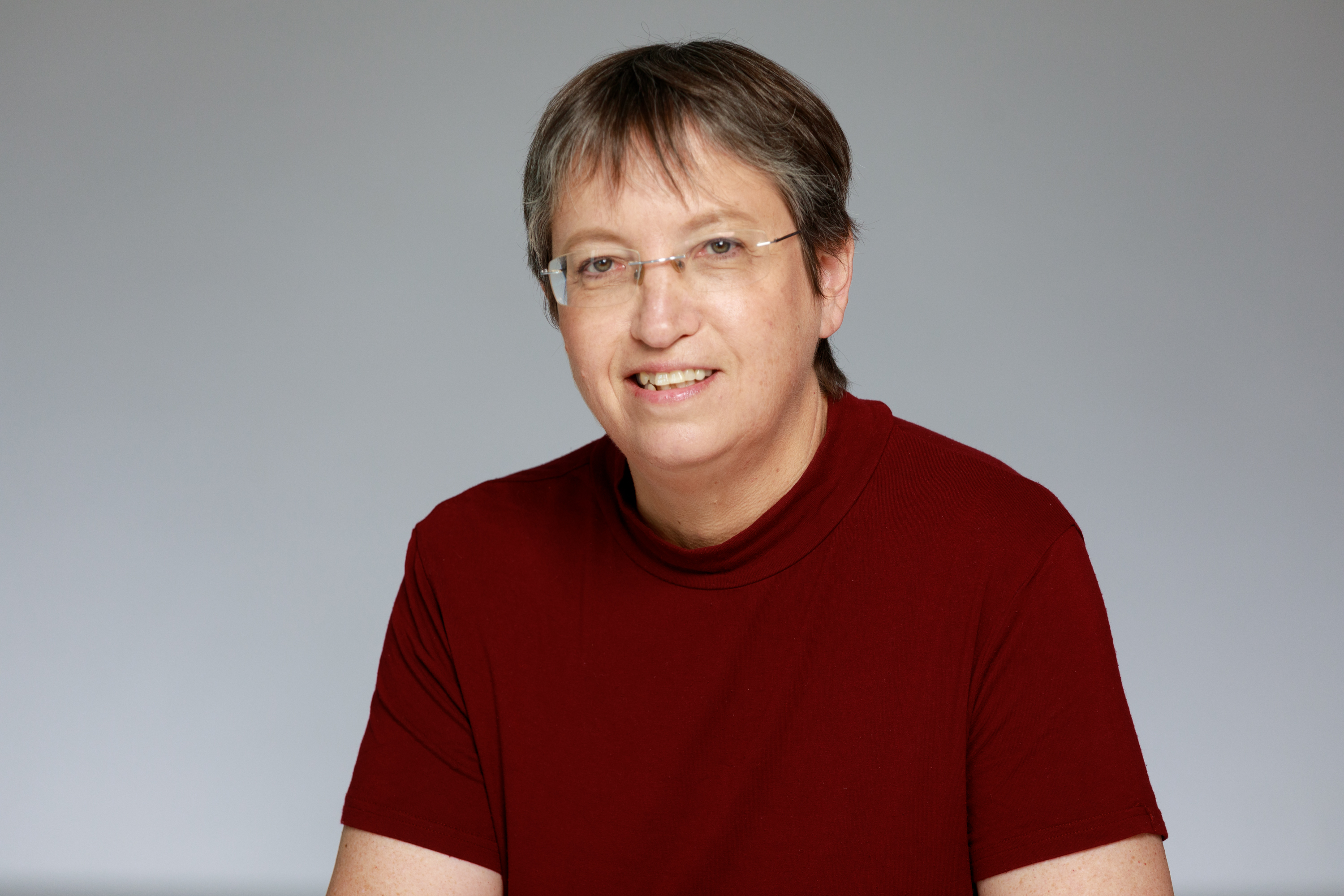
- Dor in 2024
- Born: February 5, 1967 (age 59); Haifa
- Citizenship: Israeli
- Education: Tel Aviv University (BSc); Tel Aviv University (M. Sc.); Tel Aviv University (Ph.D. in computer science)
- Occupations: Former Chief technology officer and currently Fellow and Advisor, Check Point Software Technologies; Managing partner, Qbeat Ventures; CTA Champion, Cyber Threat Alliance
- Spouse: Tomer Dor

Dorit Dor (Hebrew: דורית דור; born February 5, 1967, in Haifa) is an Israeli executive, computer scientist, chief technology officer of Check Point Software Technologies Ltd. and Israel Defense Prize winner.

== Biography ==
Dorit Dor was born to Shaya Dolinsky, a statistics manager department at the Israel Port Authority, and to Lea Dolinsky, an architect who became an artist. She learned at the Ben-Zvi secondary school in Kiryat Ono on the physical-technological track. She earned her BSc in computer science and mathematics as a part of the Atuda and in 1987, the Israel Defense Forces enlisted her to Unit 8200. She reached the rank of a major as a section head. In 1993, when she was 25, Dor won the Israel National Defense Award.

She graduated Bachelor of Science with honors and M. Sc. in computer science from Tel Aviv University. In 1996, she received her Ph.D. in computer science from Tel Aviv University. She wrote her dissertation about “Selection Algorithms” under the supervision of Uri Zwick. She has been published in scientific journals for her research on median selection, d-dimensional space, geometric pattern matching, and graph decomposition.

Shlomo Kramer, her acquaintance from the Atuda and 8200, and one of the three company's founders recruited Dor to Check Point in 1995, two years after they established it. She entered Check Point as the head of the development team of 15 people, today she is leading a team of 1400 people. She worked for 27 years as the Chief product officer. In 2023 they appointed her to the role of Chief Technological Officer and as the chairperson of Check Point Rockets. Over the years her role involves heading the company's product management, research and development and quality assurance initiatives, besides the technology partnerships and strategy. Dor was a speaker at the World Economic Forum, the RSA Conference and the GovWare conference. She serves as director of “Cyber Threat Alliance” and she sat on the board of “She Codes”, an organization dedicated to elevating the number of female programmers in Israel. She was a member of the TOP 15 steering committee, a program from the Israeli Ministry of Education that strives to expand the circle of high school students of excellence. In 2022 Redis appointed her as an independent director. Dor was included in The Software Reports’ list of the top 25 women leaders in cybersecurity of 2019 and 2020. She was included in the Solutions Review's list of the 10 key female cybersecurity leaders to know in 2020.

In 2025, Dor, along with her partner Maya Racine Netser, founded a venture capital fund focused on early-stage startups in the quantum technology sector, named Qbeat Ventures.

Dorit Dor is married to Tomer Dor and has two sons.
