= Remedio =

- Formerly: GYTPOL
- Type: Private
- Industry: Cybersecurity
- Founded: 2019
- Founders: Tal Kollender, Gilad Raz, Yakov Kogan
- Headquarters: Tel Aviv, Israel
- Area served: Worldwide
- Products: Device security posture management platform
- Number of employees: 76 (2026)
- Website: remedio.io

Remedio is an Israeli cybersecurity company based in Tel Aviv. Founded in 2019 by cybersecurity entrepreneurs Tal Kollender, Gilad Raz, and Yakov Kogan, the company develops an AI-driven platform for device posture management, automated configuration hardening, and risk remediation.

== History ==
Remedio began in 2019 under the name GYTPOL, founded by Tal Kollender (CEO), Gilad Raz, and Yakov Kogan. That same year, Israel Aerospace Industries (IAI) became the company’s first customer. GYTPOL’s platform addressed the problem of hidden misconfigurations on enterprise endpoints. Check Point Software Technologies, a multinational cybersecurity company, was its first cybersecurity customer. In 2022, the company was highlighted by Cybernews as a “Best Endpoint Protection Solution” for its platform’s automated monitoring and remediation capabilities.

In 2023, the company released its first cloud-hosted SaaS version of the platform, and in May 2024, GYTPOL formally launched version 2.0 of its security platform. The company collaborated with major cloud providers, including AWS, GCP and Microsoft Azure, on cloud-based security initiatives. In 2023, Carlsberg deployed the GYTPOL solution across 25,000 devices worldwide through its Azure-based infrastructure, following a successful pilot that demonstrated the platform’s ability to identify and remediate endpoint misconfigurations in the company’s hybrid environment. The company also provided tools for maintaining continuous CIS compliance across Amazon EC2 environments, including automated monitoring, real-time remediation, and integration with AWS Security Hub.

In 2024, GYTPOL was selected to join the inaugural AWS and CrowdStrike Cybersecurity Startup Accelerator, a program designed to support emerging companies developing advanced security technologies. During the accelerator, the company was recognized as the top startup of the cohort. Also in 2024, the company was named on the Cyber 150 list of fastest-growing cybersecurity companies and featured by CTech among Israel’s 50 Most Promising Startups.

In September 2025, GYTPOL raised its first funding round of $65 million led by Bessemer Venture Partners (with participation from TLV Partners and Picture Capital). At the same time, the company rebranded itself as Remedio. The funding round valued the company at about $300 million. The company was featured in Forbes list of next billion-dollar startups. Also in 2025, Remedio was included in Gartner’s Cool Vendors in Cyber-Physical Systems Security list.

== Overview ==
Remedio’s primary product is an AI-powered device security posture management platform. The software continuously inventories an organization’s endpoints (PCs, servers, IoT devices, etc.) and compares their configuration against security baselines and compliance standards. Any risky or outdated settings (so-called “misconfigurations”) are automatically flagged and can be remediated with a single action or on a schedule. Remedio’s platform also includes a remediation engine that fixes problems in real time, with full rollback capability if needed.

The system integrates with existing IT and security tools (e.g. ServiceNow, CrowdStrike, Microsoft Defender). Remedio shuts down the most available and exploitable attack paths and lateral movement internally by continuously healing endpoint configurations.

== Operations ==
Remedio is headquartered in Wilmington, Delaware and Tel Aviv, Israel, and maintains offices and staff in the United States and Europe. Its executive team is led by former Israeli military cyber veteran Tal Kollender, who is Chief Executive Officer, Matt Rowe (Chief Technology Officer) and Mor Bikovsky (Chief Business Officer).

As of 2025, Remedio employs 65 people worldwide.

The company was bootstrapped until the 2025 funding. In the 2025 Series A round, investors led by Bessemer Venture Partners acquired a minority stake, with the founders retaining majority control.

Remedio operates across North America, Europe, and Asia, serving global enterprises, including Fortune 500 companies like Amazon, Coca-Cola, Kraft Heinz, Eaton, and Colgate-Palmolive. Its platform runs in cloud, offline, and isolated network environments.
