= Stonesoft Corporation =

Finnish network security company

- Type: Division
- Industry: Network Security
- Founded: Helsinki, Finland (1990)
- Founder: Ilkka Hiidenheimo; Hannu Turunen
- Fate: Acquired by McAfee (2013)
- Headquarters: Helsinki, Finland
- Area served: Worldwide
- Key people: Ilkka Hiidenheimo (Chairman & CEO); Juha Kivikoski (COO); Mikael Nyberg (CFO); Jarno Limnéll (Cyber Security Director)
- Products: Network security Firewall; IPS; VPN; Security appliances Virtual appliances
- Number of employees: 222 (Dec 2011)
- Parent: Forcepoint
- Website: stonesoft.com

Stonesoft Corporation was a public company that developed and sold network security services based in Helsinki, Finland. It was publicly owned until 2013 when it was acquired by Intel's subsidiary McAfee.

Stonesoft conducted business globally, with a regional headquarters in Atlanta, Georgia, United States, and sales offices throughout Europe, the Middle East, and China.

In July 2013, McAfee, a part of Intel Security, completed a tender offer to acquire all Stonesoft products and technologies. Stonesoft became a part of the McAfee Network Security Business Unit. Stonesoft firewall products were renamed McAfee Next Generation Firewall. McAfee sold Stonesoft to Forcepoint in January 2016.

== History ==
Founded in 1990, Stonesoft started as a systems integrator in the Nordic regions of Europe. In 1994 it introduced StoneBeat, a technology for creating a high availability pair of firewalls in an active-passive configuration. In 1999, the company extended StoneBeat with a patented load balancing clustering technology, launching StoneBeat FullCluster. It was one of the first technologies certified in Check Point's OPSEC program.

In 2001, Stonesoft expanded its product set into the firewall/VPN space, becoming a direct competitor to Check Point. The StoneGate Firewall/VPN was launched on March 19, 2001. In January 2003, the company introduced the first virtual firewall/VPN, for IBM mainframes.

In 2010, the company released information via CERT-FI on Advanced Evasion technique (AETs) that met with skepticism in the community. Further AETs were released in 2011, and eventually verified by independent labs and researchers.

In 2012, "Stonesoft" replaced the "StoneGate" product name. From now on, Stonesoft is used both as the company and product name.

== Products ==
Its product portfolio includes firewall/VPN devices, IPS (intrusion detection and prevention systems), and SSL VPN systems, each available as hardware appliances, software, and VMware-certified virtual appliances.

Each of the components, as well as third-party devices, can be managed from the Stonesoft Management Center.

== Controversy ==
In 2008, the Helsinki Court of Appeal issued a decision in a case brought against Stonesoft and several members of its management team. The court "held that two members of the company's board of directors and a former CEO through gross negligence had failed to give a profit warning in due time". The issue at hand was discrepancies between the profitability forecasted in the company's year 2000 interim reports and the actual state of the company at that time. The reports indicated the company was sound and profitable, yet "a profit warning should in fact have been issued". The District Court of Helsinki had originally dismissed the claims in a decision on November 15, 2006.

== Advanced Evasion Techniques ==
In 2010 Stonesoft informed the public about a new evasion technique that can bypass security defences. Stonesoft defines the Advanced Evasion Techniques (AETs) as "virtually limitless in quantity and unrecognizable by conventional detection methods. They can work on all levels of the TCP/IP stack and work across many protocols or protocol combinations."

According to Max Nyman, Stonesoft Corporation's Senior Marketing Manager, AETs can deliver malicious code without detection and without leaving trace.

On July 23, 2012 Stonesoft released a free tool that enables organisations to test their network security.
