= Check Point Integrity =

Endpoint security software product

Check Point Integrity is an endpoint security software product developed by Check Point Software Technologies. It is designed to protect personal computers and the networks they connect to from computer worms, Trojan horses, spyware, and intrusion attempts by hackers. The software aims to stop new PC threats and attacks before signature updates have been installed on the PC. The software includes.

- network access controls that detect and remedy security policy violations before a PC is allowed to connect to a network;
- application controls that block or terminate malicious software programs before they can transmit information to an unauthorized party;
- a personal firewall;
- an intrusion prevention system (IPS) Check Point Intrusion Prevention System – IPS;
- spyware detection and removal;
- and instant messaging security tools.

An administrator manages the security policies that apply to groups of users from a central console and server.

Check Point acquired the Integrity software as part of its acquisition of endpoint security start-up Zone Labs in 2004. The Integrity software, released in early 2002, was derived from the ZoneAlarm security technology and added central policy management and network access control functions. Integrity was integrated with network gateways (the Cisco VPN 3000 series) to ensure that a PC met security requirements before it was granted access to the network.

Demand for endpoint security grew in 2003 after the SQL Slammer and Blaster computer worms reportedly caused extensive damage, despite widespread use of antivirus software on personal computers. A number of destructive worms that followed, and the subsequent rise of spyware as a significant problem, continued to increase demand for endpoint security products. Data privacy and integrity regulations and required security audits mandated by governmental and professional authorities, along with infections and damage caused by guest PC access, have also prompted use of such security software.

Competitors include Symantec/Sygate, Cisco Security Agent, McAfee Entercept, and even point products like Determina's Memory Firewall.
