= Altor =

Altor may refer to:

- Altor Equity Partners, a firm
- Altor Networks, cybersecurity business
