= Tal Kollender =

Israeli cybersecurity entrepreneur

- טל קולנדר
- Born: Tel Aviv, Israel
- Education: Open University of Israel
- Occupations: Cybersecurity entrepreneur, CEO of Remedio
- Known for: Founding Remedio (formerly Gytpol)

Tal Kollender (Hebrew: טל קולנדר) is an Israeli cybersecurity entrepreneur, best known as co-founder and CEO of Remedio, a Tel Aviv–based cybersecurity company.

== Biography ==
=== Early life and education ===
Tal Kollender was raised in Rosh HaAyin, Israel. Her father worked as a private investigator, while her mother held various positions primarily in procurement. Demonstrating an early interest in technology, Kollender taught herself to hack online games by the age of 13, which sparked her passion for cybersecurity and identifying security vulnerabilities in organizational systems. In 2013, she enrolled at the Open University of Israel, where she pursued studies in computer science and management.

=== Military Service ===
Kollender served in the Israel Defense Forces (IDF), notably in Mamram, the IDF's Computing and Communications Center, and with the Special Forces. Her military experience provided her with foundational skills in cybersecurity and IT management, which she later applied in her professional career.

=== Career ===
Following her military service, Kollender transitioned to the private sector, taking on roles as a security architect and Chief Information Security Officer (CISO) at firms, including Dell EMC.

In 2019, she co-founded the cybersecurity startup Remedio (originally GYTPOL). Remedio specializes in developing innovative software solutions that automatically identify and rectify insecure configurations in endpoints and devices, focusing on automated device posture management. Her company developed software to identify and automatically fix insecure configurations in endpoints and devices — a form of automated device posture management.

Under her leadership, the company achieved significant milestones, serving major enterprises such as Carlsberg, Colgate-Palmolive, Toyota, Check Point Software, Eaton, and El Al Airlines. In recognition of these achievements, in 2023, Kollender was named Female Entrepreneur of the Year by the United Cybersecurity Alliance. By 2024, local media began referring to Kollender as Israel’s Cyber Queen.

In 2025, Remedio broke into the mainstream with a Forbes feature about Kollender and how she bootstrapped the company to a $300 million valuation.
