= Linux Spike Trojan malware =

Malware for Linux

Linux Spike Trojan malware, more widely known as MrBlack, is a type of malware that infects routers, and eventually spreads to other routers. Incapsula, an internet security firm, first saw this malware in December 2014. This tool is prone to attack devices that still use the default credentials. A "bot" is a type of malware that allows an attacker to take control over an affected computer. Also known as "Web robots," bots are usually part of a network of infected machines, known as a "botnet," which is typically made up of victim machines that stretch across the globe.

Once the router has been infected, the attack injects malware in order to configure DDoS attacks. It can be used for MITM attacks, cookie hijacking and other attacks after the targeted router has been infected.

MrBlack is regarded as one of the most widespread malware varieties infecting over forty thousand routers.
