= Alkasir =

Internet censorship circumvention free software

Alkasir (Arabic: الكاسر, lit. 'the breaker') is an internet censorship circumvention free software developed by Yemeni software developer Walid al-Saqaf. Al-Saqaf is the son of Yemeni investigative journalist Abdulaziz Al-Saqqaf who died under what The Guardian called "mysterious circumstances" and who had set up a news website focusing on Yemeni affairs, YemenPortal.net, while he was earning a PhD in Sweden. Alkasir was created when the government blocked access to the site using Websense, and later, Netsweeper.

Alkasir was launched in 2009 with the newest version, added in May 2010, containing an internal browser with updates often being released.

Governments around the world, most notably in China and in the Middle East, use censorship to block access to various websites. In light of using social networking sites in political movements, such as the Arab Spring, Middle Eastern governments have implemented Western tools to censor the internet.

Alkasir's site also contains a map tracking the use of its software to gain access to particular URLs. The more people using the software to access a particular site, such as Facebook, the more likely it is blocked by the people's country.

As of 2012, the Arab country with the highest number of Alkasir users was Syria and the software received over a hundred thousand reports of blocked URLs.

Walid al-Saqaf was selected as a TED fellow in 2010 for the development of Alkasir. He was also selected as a TED 2012 senior fellow.
