= Forcepoint =

Multinational corporation software company

Forcepoint LLC
- Formerly: NetPartners (1994–1999); Websense (1999–2015); Raytheon|Websense(2015–2021)
- Type: Private
- Industry: Cyber security
- Founded: 2016; 10 years ago in Austin, Texas
- Founder: Phil Trubey
- Headquarters: Austin, Texas, U.S.
- Area served: Worldwide
- Key people: Ryan Windham, CEO
- Owner: Francisco Partners (2021–present); Raytheon (2015-2021); Vista Equity Partners (2013–2015)
- Number of employees: 1,400+ (2026)
- Website: www.forcepoint.com

Forcepoint is an American multinational corporation software company headquartered in Austin, Texas. It develops computer security software, including data protection, cloud access security broker and firewall products.

Forcepoint was founded in 1994 as an information technology reseller called NetPartners. It was renamed Websense in 1999 and became a public company in 2000 at the peak of the dot-com bubble. Vista Equity Partners acquired Websense in 2013 for $906 million. Raytheon acquired an 80% interest in Websense in April 2015 for $1.9 billion and acquired the remaining 20% interest in 2019. In 2015, Websense acquired network security vendor Stonesoft from Intel and in 2016, the company was renamed Forcepoint. Francisco Partners acquired the company from Raytheon successor RTX Corporation in January 2021.

== Corporate history ==
=== NetPartners ===
The company was founded in 1994 as NetPartners in Sorrento Valley, San Diego by Phil Trubey. The company began as a reseller of network security products, and then developed software for controlling Internet use by employees.

In 1998, NetPartners raised $6 million in venture capital funding and had $6 million in annual revenue. Later that year, investors pushed Trubey out of the CEO position and appointed John Carrington as his replacement.

=== Websense ===
In June 1999, NetPartners was renamed Websense. In March 2000, at the peak of the dot-com bubble, it raised $72 million in an initial public offering. The stock price doubled on its first day of trading.

In 2006, former McAfee CEO Gene Hodges succeeded Carrington as chief executive officer of the company. That year, Websense acquired a fingerprint security company, PortAuthority, for $90 million. In October 2007, it acquired email security vendor SurfControl for $400 million. In 2009, it acquired Defensio, a spam and malware company focused on social media.

By 2009, Websense had 1,400 employees, with offices in England, China, Australia, and Israel. In 2011, Facebook deployed Websense to check every link users shared on the site.

In 2013, Vista Equity Partners acquired the company for $906 million. Websense headquarters were moved to San Diego that year and to Austin, Texas in 2014. In 2015, Raytheon acquired the firm from Vista Equity Partners for $1.9 billion and combined it with RCP, formerly part of its IIS segment, to form Raytheon|Websense. In October 2015, Raytheon added Foreground Security for $62 million.

=== Forcepoint ===
Raytheon acquired an 80% interest in Websense in May 2015 for about $1.9 billion. In October 2015, the company acquired two subsidiaries of Intel, Stonesoft and Sidewinder, for $389 million. Stonesoft was a network security product previously known as "McAfee Next-Generation Firewall;" Sidewinder was a firewall previously known as McAfee Firewall Enterprise.

In January 2016, Websense, along with the two subsidiaries Stonesoft and Sidewinder, were merged and rebranded as Forcepoint. Raytheon's "Cyber Products" business was also merged into the new brand. At the time, Forcepoint had 2,000 employees, with one-third of its customers being departments in the federal government of the United States. Forcepoint was the smallest of five major businesses owned by Raytheon, but had the highest profit margin. In early 2017, the company reorganized its sales force and refocused its portfolio on web security, data loss prevention and insider threat prevention. Its executive vice president of sales also left. CRN reported, citing unnamed sources, that the reorganization involved layoffs, while Forcepoint described the changes as a repositioning of employees.

In April 2016, Matthew Moynahan was appointed chief executive officer of Forcepoint. In February 2017, Forcepoint acquired a cloud-based access broker (CASB) security product from Imperva called Skyfence. In August 2017, it acquired user and entity behavior analytics company RedOwl. In the fourth quarter of 2019, Raytheon acquired the remaining 20% of the company from Vista Ventures Partners LLC for $588 million.

In October 2020, Francisco Partners announced their agreement to acquire Forcepoint from Raytheon successor RTX Corporation. The transaction was completed in January 2021.

In July 2023, Francisco Partners agreed to divest the government cybersecurity business of Forcepoint to buyout firm TPG Inc. for $2.45 billion. A year later, in late January 2024, Forcepoint Federal rebranded as Everfox.

In March 2025, Forcepoint agreed to acquire Getvisibility, a developer of data security posture management software based in Cork, Ireland. The acquisition closed the following month.

=== Version history ===
By 1997, three years after Forcepoint was founded, the company had published version 3 of its software. Version 3.0 introduced the software's first graphical, web-based administrative user interface. At the time, Forcepoint's software was only used to prevent employees from viewing certain types of content at work, but in 2006 features were added to detect when employees were attempting to visit websites suspected of hosting malicious code.

In 2007 Websense introduced a product to control the content a user could see on social media websites, an endpoint security product, a website reputation ranker, and a small business version. Additionally, a product was added to the Websense suite claimed to identify sensitive files in un-secure locations on the corporate network and looks for records of those files being transmitted.

Available filtering categories on Websense included "Professional and Worker Organizations" (such as trade unions), "Sites sponsored by or providing information about political parties and interest groups" (such as civil rights organisations), "Gay or Lesbian or Bisexual Interest", "Sex education", "Sites that provide information about or promote religions not specified in Traditional Religions", and "Sports". A 2008 study on the use of Websense within the Technical Colleges of Georgia found that only two categories were blocked in all of the colleges surveyed, and that 39 categories out of the 43 listed were blocked by some, but not all, colleges, with numbers ranging from two colleges blocking a given category to 23 out of the 24 responents. In a 2005, report the Rhode Island branch of the American Civil Liberties Union called Websense a deeply flawed technology. It further noted that, although the blocking technology had improved over the years since 2002, it still remained a "blunt instrument" and that in public libraries equipped with Websense people of all ages were "still denied access to a wide range of legitimate material."

Websense introduced its first appliance product in 2009.

In 2010, some products were consolidated into the Triton software, which became responsible for increasingly large portions of the company's revenue. In February 2012, Forcepoint released a cloud-based suite of IT security products for smartphones, tablets, laptops, USB drives, and other mobile devices. Upgrades to the suite in 2012 added the ability to identify confidential information in an image file. At the 2016 rebranding the company introduced three products, addressing insider threats, data loss prevention for Office 365, and network security.

== Products ==
Websense's software blocked access to websites and let companies inspect network traffic and filter email for security threats. A cloud-based version introduced in 2012 extended those checks to mobile devices, and let employers designate categories of sensitive material, such as financial documents, that could not be retrieved on a phone or tablet.

When the Forcepoint brand was introduced in 2016, the company said it would concentrate on insider threats, cloud data protection and network security. Its products at that point included the TRITON platform, hosted on Microsoft Azure to enforce data protection for Exchange Online in Office 365, and its data loss prevention product, TRITON AP-DATA. They also included SureView Insider Threat, which ranked the users posing the greatest risk within an organization by their behavior and by information from AP-DATA, and could record and replay their activity. The line also included the Stonesoft and Sidewinder firewalls, sold previously by Intel Security as McAfee Next-Generation Firewall and McAfee Firewall Enterprise. A cloud access security broker based on Imperva's Skyfence product and user and entity behavior analytics based on RedOwl were added in 2017.

== Censorship ==
Forcepoint has a policy against selling to governments and ISPs that engage in Internet censorship, however it has been criticized for a "perceived link to censorship of free speech and the dissemination of knowledge."

In 2009, it was discovered that the Yemeni government was using Forcepoint's products to monitor the public's internet use and block tools that allow citizens to hide their internet use from the government and the software Alkasir was created to circumvent it. Forcepoint responded by cutting off the country's access to the firm's database updates. However, then Sanaa based British-Irish journalist Iona Craig complained on Twitter, access to Tumblr, which many press agents use to spread news, remained closed inside Yemen, her pleas being ignored. It soon appeared that Canadian software company Netsweeper also aids Yemen authorities to censor, even the Houthi government being its customer.

In 2011, Forcepoint said it would join the Global Network Initiative, which is focused on privacy and Internet freedom. It left the initiative in 2014.

A 2002 study in JAMA found that Forcepoint had the best-performing web-filtering products in terms of blocking pornography while allowing health information. In contrast, a 2005 report by the Rhode Island branch of the American Civil Liberties Union said Forcepoint is a "blunt instrument" and that in public libraries equipped with Forcepoint people of all ages "are still denied access to a wide range of legitimate material." A 2006 report by Brennan Center for Justice found that Forcepoint often blocked websites that discussed pornography, but did not actually feature pornography. The software also blocked a furniture website called "the-strippers.com", which is not pornographic, but a website for a furniture refinisher. In the author's study, 0-15 percent of the sites blocked by Forcepoint should have been viewable by the user and 10 percent of objectionable websites were let through, rather than blocked. According to blogger Jillian York, Forcepoint blocks pages that contain pornographic links anywhere in its content, even in the comments section. He said, "a malicious attacker could get your whole site blocked at any time by the simple procedure of leaving dangerous, malicious or pornographic links in a blog's comments".

For approximately 15 minutes in 2009, Forcepoint classified router company Cisco Systems's website under 'hack sites', due to one of Cisco's IP addresses being named on a hacker website. The IP address was reviewed and deemed not a threat.
