= Veriti =

Israeli exposure-management cybersecurity company

- Type: Subsidiary
- Industry: Cybersecurity
- Founded: 2021
- Founders: Adi Ikan; Oren Koren
- Headquarters: Tel Aviv, Israel
- Area served: Worldwide
- Key people: Adi Ikan (CEO), Oren Koren (CPO)
- Parent: Check Point Software Technologies (since 2025)
- Website: veriti.ai

Veriti is an Israeli cybersecurity company that develops software for threat exposure management and automated remediation across multi-vendor environments. The company emerged from stealth in November 2022 with $18.5 million in funding and was acquired by Check Point Software Technologies in 2025.

== History ==
Veriti was founded in 2021 by Adi Ikan and Oren Koren, who previously worked at Check Point. The company publicly launched in November 2022; TechCrunch reported total funding of $18.5 million led by Insight Partners, with participation from NFX and Amiti.

On 27 May 2025, Check Point announced a definitive agreement to acquire Veriti. The deal received coverage from business and trade media, including Globes, Calcalist/CTech, CRN, Information Security Media Group, MSSP Alert and IT Pro. Industry databases list the acquisition as completed in mid-2025.

== Products and services ==
Veriti's platform aggregates telemetry from security controls, vulnerabilities, and misconfigurations. It applies or recommends safe compensating changes to reduce exposure across on-premises and cloud environments, while aiming to avoid disruption to operations.

== See also ==
- Threat intelligence
- Check Point Software Technologies
