= Tipalti =

American financial technology company

- Type: Private
- Industry: Financial technology
- Founded: 2010; 16 years ago
- Founders: Chen Amit; Oren Zeev
- Headquarters: Foster City, California, United States
- Services: Accounts payable; Finance automation; Mass payments
- Number of employees: 1,250 (2024)
- Website: tipalti.com

Tipalti is an American multinational financial technology company headquartered in Foster City, California, with offices in Amsterdam, London, Plano, Tbilisi, Tel Aviv, Toronto, and Vancouver. The company provides accounts payable, procurement, expense management, and global payments automation software for businesses.

== History ==
Entrepreneurs Chen Amit and Oren Zeev raised capital from investors in their personal networks in the summer of 2010 to start Tipalti after observing popular payment processors, such as PayPal, Square, and Stripe, concentrating their efforts on collecting payments. In contrast, Amit and Zeev focused on building a mass payments software-as-a-service platform and application programming interface (API) for companies needing to pay 100 or more parties worldwide or multiple payment options.

Tipalti became a licensed money transmitter in various US states, the UK, and across the European Union to process remittances and began offering automated mass payments in September 2011. The service was originally popular with ad exchanges, ad networks, affiliate networks, and publishers because of the high volume and complexity of making payments, fraud risk, and regulation in the online advertising industry.

On April 12, 2021, Tipalti announced it acquired the cloud procurement services firm Approve.com to expand its product to "improve company-wide spend visibility and greatly strengthen their spend and financial controls," Amit said in a prepared statement announcing the acquisition. The acquisition, the company's first, enabled Tipalti to automate the entire accounts payable cycle and support more finance operations and workflows.

In September 2022, Tipalti opened an office in the Netherlands. One year later, the company expanded its European operations with an Electronic Money Institution (EMI) license from De Nederlandsche Bank.

In December 2024, Tipalti officially registered as a money services business with the Financial Transactions and Reports Analysis Centre of Canada, expanding operations in Canada.

In June 2025, Tipalti acquired treasury company Statement to add AI-driven cash flow visibility and forecasting to its product.

As of 2026, Tipalti processed $90 billion in total payments annually.

== Products and services ==
Tipalti helps mid and large-sized companies pay contractors, employees, suppliers, and vendors in different currencies and more than 190 countries by ACH bank transfer, cash through Western Union, check, direct deposit, PayPal, prepaid debit card, virtual cards, and wire transfer. The mass payments platform disburses funds from the customer's bank account and not third-party transfers.

Companies use Tipalti's API on their website to automate and schedule payments and finance operations natively through a white-labeled payments system. The software also allows accounting and finance departments to manage compliance, enterprise resource planning, expenses, intake and procurement, invoices, payment cards, reconciliation, suppliers, and taxes.

Tipalti's software uses AI and machine learning to automate data entry and other financial tasks; it also integrates and syncs with different accounting software, including QuickBooks.

Tipalti released Tipalti Expenses, an expense management and automation product, in September 2023.

In 2026, the company released Tipalti Treasury, a treasury management system, and an AI agent that automates the accounts payable process.

Since 2018, Tipalti's purchase order (PO) matching and multi-entity capability has been fully integrated with NetSuite, a global cloud enterprise resource planning provider, as part of its existing NetSuite integration. Tipalti Detect, a module for preventative fraud monitoring, is embedded in Tipalti's accounts payable platform. The company also offers the Tipalti Card in physical or digital form, enabling companies to create credit or debit cards for employees.

== Reception ==
Tipalti has raised more than $700 million in venture-capital funding from investors including JPMorgan Chase, G Squared, Morgan Stanley’s Counterpoint Global investment team, and others since its founding to support its operations.
