= Shlomo Kramer =

Israeli information technology entrepreneur

- שלמה קרמר
- Born: 1966 (age 59–60)
- Citizenship: Israeli
- Education: Tel Aviv University (B.C.S and BMath), Hebrew University (M.C.S)
- Occupations: Entrepreneur, investor

Shlomo Kramer (Hebrew: שלמה קרמר; born 1966), is an Israeli information technology entrepreneur and investor. He is the co-founder of cyber-security companies Check Point and Imperva, as well as Cato Networks, a cloud-based network security provider.

As of March 2026, Forbes listed Shlomo Kramer's net worth at US$2.4 billion, ranking him at 1,694 on the Billionaires list. He is ranked among the top 20 wealthiest people in Israel.

== Early life ==
Shlomo Kramer has been actively involved with technology all his life. As a youth, he worked on mainframes and sold video games.

Kramer served in the Israel Defense Forces' Unit 8200, a cybersecurity and intelligence team whose operations include gathering, analyzing and decrypting data; over the years, the unit has produced many of Israel's top high-tech entrepreneurs. After completing his military service, Kramer earned a master's degree in Computer Science from the Hebrew University of Jerusalem and a bachelor's degree in Mathematics and Computer Science from Tel Aviv University.

== Career ==
Kramer, who has been called "the godfather of Israeli cybersecurity," is a serial high-tech investor and entrepreneur with "a long track record of success". He founded his first startup during high school in the 1980s along with Ofer Shemtov, and the company was later sold to a software firm. In 1993, he co-founded Check Point Software along with Gil Shwed and Marius Nacht; the company introduced the first firewall to the commercial market and went on to become "a world leader in protecting the information that flows round the Internet, and a flagship of Israel's high-tech industry". Kramer left Check Point in 1998 and used the money from the sale of his stake to strike out on his own as an entrepreneur and investor in numerous startups.

In 2002, Kramer founded his second startup, WebCohort, renamed Imperva in 2004, together with Mickey Boodaei and Amichai Shulman. Imperva moved away from perimeter defenses such as firewalls and instead deployed its software to protect against hackers and business-data theft by identifying and preventing attacks before they find their way to the inside of an organization.

The company's initial public offering on the New York Stock Exchange raised $90 million, with its shares gaining 33% on its first day of trading on 9 November 2011. In 2014, Imperva acquired Skyfence, a cloud security gateway startup in which Kramer was a lead investor, and bought the shares it did not already own in Incapsula, a cloud-based website performance and security service in which it had already invested. The acquisitions helped Imperva extend its data security strategy throughout the cloud.

Kramer's belief in the cloud as the next big development in cybersecurity led him to establish Cato Networks in 2015, together with former Imperva colleague Gur Shatz. Kramer acted as the Cato Network's CEO since its inception. Cato Networks' software integrates all the elements of an organization's network – including branch locations, data centers, mobile users and more – into one encrypted network in the cloud. This means the enterprise is no longer tied to an array of location-bound appliances to protect its data.

== Investments ==
In addition to co-founding Check Point, Imperva and Cato Networks, Kramer has invested in many companies and startups including Palo Alto Networks, Exabeam, Trusteer, WatchDox, Aryon security and LightCyber, mostly in the field of data security.

== Controversy ==
In a December 2025 appearance on CNBC, Kramer called for limiting the American right to free speech under the First Amendment., saying, "[a]nd I know it’s difficult to hear, but it’s time to limit the First Amendment in order to protect it....I mean that we need to control the platforms, all the social platforms. We need to stack, rank the authenticity of every person that expresses themselves online and take control over what they are saying, based on that ranking." Clips from this interview went viral on X where free-speech advocates criticized his opinion.

== See also ==
- Silicon Wadi
- Science and technology in Israel
