= Gil Shwed =

Israeli businessman

Gil Shwed גיל שויד
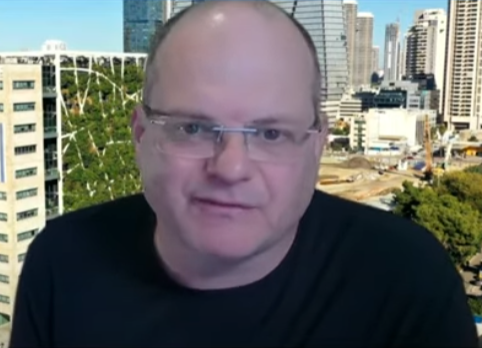
- Speaking at the 2021 World Economic Forum
- Born: 1968 (age 57–58); Jerusalem, Israel
- Occupations: Co-founder and Executive Chairman of the Board, Check Point Software Technologies

Gil Shwed (Hebrew: גיל שויד; born 1968) is an Israeli software engineer and entrepreneur. He is the co-founder and Executive Chairman of the Board of Check Point, one of Israel's largest technology companies and the world's largest pure-play cybersecurity company. Shwed was CEO from 1994 until 2024, the longest tenure for a Nasdaq-listed company.

He is considered the inventor of the modern computer firewall.

== Early life ==
Shwed was born in Jerusalem. He started programming at the age of 13, and two years later began studying computer sciences at Hebrew University in Jerusalem, while he was still in high-school.

During his military service he was part of the Intelligence Corps' Unit 8200. Afterwards, Shwed joined the Israeli startup company Optrotech (currently Orbotech), where he worked as a Software Developer.

== Career ==
In 1993, Shwed founded Check Point with Shlomo Kramer, Shwed's friend from the military unit, and Marius Nacht with whom he worked at Optrotech.

That year, Shwed invented and patented stateful inspection, which was the basis for the first version of the company's renowned FireWall-1, released in 1994. Stateful Inspection is still widely used in network firewalls today.

1994 Shwed became the chief executive officer and director of Check Point. He previously was president of Check Point and chairman of the board. As of 2018, Shwed is the leading shareholder in Checkpoint, owning 19.1% of the company, with an estimated worth of US$3.4 billion. The second largest shareholder in Check Point is US investment company Massachusetts Financial Services with a 7.7% stake worth $1.3 billion at present.

Shwed and Check Point emphasize the "fifth generation" of cybersecurity, addressing the underlying issues behind such vulnerabilities as the WannaCry and NotPetya security breaches in 2017. He has stated that enterprise businesses are "two generations behind" in their security thinking, and describes the industry as being at an "inflection point."

As of January 27, 2024, Forbes listed Gil Shwed net worth at US$4.38 billion, ranking him 682 on the Billionaires list.

In 2024, Shwed stepped down as CEO and became Executive Chairman of the Board.

== Boards ==
He is a member of the Board of Trustees of Tel Aviv University and the Chairman of the Board of Trustees of the Youth University of Tel Aviv University. He is also a member of the Board of Directors of Yeholot Association founded by the Rashi Foundation whose charter is, among other things, to reduce dropout rates in high schools.

== Acknowledgments ==
He received an honorary doctorate from the Technion – Israel Institute of Technology in June 2005.

Globes newspaper honored Shwed as their "Person of the Year" in 2014.

In 2018, Shwed was the recipient of the first-ever Israel Prize in technology.

== Personal life ==
Shwed resides in Tel Aviv. He has children - 3 from his first wife, Hamutal Einhorn, and 3 from his current wife, Meytal Danino Shwed.
