= Cyberint =

Cyber security firm

- Company type: Subsidiary
- Industry: Cybersecurity
- Founded: 2009
- Founders: Itay Yanovski, Raz Alon, Shay Priel
- Headquarters: Tel Aviv, Israel; Redwood City, California, U.S.
- Area served: Worldwide
- Number of employees: Part of Check Point (6,699 employees as of 2024)
- Parent: Check Point Software Technologies
- Website: www.cyberint.com

Cyberint, now known as Cyberint, a Check Point Company or Check Point External Risk Management, is a global cyber security firm specializing in the detection, investigation, and mitigation of external cyber threats.

Founded in 2009, the company was acquired by Check Point Software Technologies on October 1, 2024.

== History ==
Cyberint was founded in 2009 by Itay Yanovski, Raz Alon, and Shay Priel. In 2016, BBC News reported that Cyberint discovered dark‑web forum discussions dating from September 2016 indicating successful brute‑force attacks on Tesco Bank accounts, two months before the bank announced a £2.5 million loss.

In August 2020, Yochai Corem was appointed CEO of Cyberint, succeeding Itai Margalit, who had served from 2019 to 2020. Before Margalit, Amir Ofek was CEO from 2016 to 2019.

On April 20, 2023, Cyberint launched a new supply chain intelligence module to help organizations mitigate third-party risks.

On August 27, 2024, Check Point Software Technologies announced its intention to acquire Cyberint. At the same time, Cyberint Research Team reported the discovery of UULoader, a malware loader that disguises itself as legitimate application installers and uses DLL side‑loading to deploy Gh0st RAT and Mimikatz payloads, primarily targeting Chinese‑ and Korean‑language users. The acquisition was completed on October 1, 2024, integrating Cyberint into Check Point as part of its External Risk Management division.

== Overview ==
Cyberint, now part of Check Point Software Technologies, provides cybersecurity services that focus on identifying and managing external threats. The company helps organizations reduce risk by offering tools and intelligence to detect potential cyber threats before they cause harm.

Cyberint develops Threat Intelligence by analyzing data from open sources, deep, and dark web platforms to detect cyber threats; Attack Surface Management for identifying vulnerabilities across digital assets; Brand Protection to monitor and remove unauthorized use of company identities and address phishing; Deep and Dark Web Monitoring for detecting data breaches and cybercriminal activities; and Supply Chain Intelligence for assessing risks related to third-party vendors and partners.

== Funding ==
On January 1, 2014, Cyberint secured its Series A funding round, raising $10 million to scale operations and enhance its threat detection technologies.

The company raised $18 million in a Series B round on May 31, 2018, led by Viola Growth, which contributed $12 million.

On June 21, 2022, Cyberint closed a Series C funding round with $28 million in equity and an additional $12 million in credit.
