= Oren Zeev =

Israeli-American businessman (b. 1964)

- אורן זאב
- Born: September 23, 1964 (age 62); Haifa, Israel
- Education: BSc cum laude Electrical Engineering, Technion, Israel. MBA with Distinction, INSEAD, France
- Occupation: Venture capitalist
- Spouse: Hagit Zeev

Oren Zeev (Hebrew: אורן זאב; September 23, 1964, Haifa, Israel) is an Israeli-American businessman. He is the head of a venture capital, Zeev Ventures, and co-founded a non-profit.

As of 2024, Forbes listed Oren Zeev with a net worth at US$2.2 billion.

== Career ==
Zeev started Zeev Ventures in 2007 in Palo Alto. As of 2025, the firm manages an estimated $2.5 billion in assets. In 2010, Zeev co-founded Tipalti.

Zeev appeared on Forbes and CNBC in 2017 and 2019, respectively.

== Personal life ==
Zeev was born in Haifa, Israel in 1964. He moved to California with his wife, Hagit Zeev, and two children in 2002. Zeev currently lives in Los Altos Hills, California.
