= Mplify Alliance =

- Website: www.mplify.net

The Mplify Alliance, originally Metro Ethernet Forum and later MEF Forum, is a nonprofit international industry consortium, of network, cloud, and technology providers. It was originally dedicated to Carrier Ethernet networks and services, and in recent years, significantly broadened its scope, which now includes underlay connectivity services such as Optical, Carrier Ethernet, IP, along with overlay digital services including SD-WAN Services, as well as APIs to support orchestration of the service lifecycle (termed Lifecycle Service Orchestration, or LSO APIs based on MEF 55 Lifecycle Service Orchestration (LSO): Reference Architecture and Framework, for connectivity and digital services). Along with this change in scope, MEF re-branded from the "Metro Ethernet Forum", to simply "MEF". "MEF Forum" is MEF's legal name.

The forum is composed of service providers, incumbent local exchange carriers, network equipment vendors, cloud providers and other related organizations, within the information and communications technology industry, that share an interest in connectivity services, digital services, automation, orchestration and standardization to pragmatically enhance and accelerate the industry's digital transformation. There are approximately 200 MEF members, many of which have achieved MEF 3.0 certification of their MEF-standardized services or technology.

MEF comprises multiple technical committees to develop, evolve and promote the adoption of MEF standard services and interfaces. The forum regularly makes recommendations to, and collaborates with, existing standards bodies, such as the Internet Engineering Task Force (IETF) and the Institute of Electrical and Electronics Engineers (IEEE).

== History ==
Logo of the Metro Ethernet Forum as of 2003

Logo of the EFMA

MEF was preceded by the Ethernet in the First Mile Alliance (EFMA), also a nonprofit international industry consortium, which was established in 2001 to promote standards-based Ethernet in the first mile (EFM) technologies and products and position EFM as a networking technology for an access network.

In 2005, with the completion of the 802.3ah standard by the IEEE, the EFMA became part of MEF.

In 2015, MEF voted to change its name to "MEF Forum" to reflect its expansion in setting standards for network virtualization.

In 2017, the International Multimedia Telecommunications Consortium (IMTC) was merged into MEF.

In 2018, MEF published its first technical standards on optical transport (MEF 63) and IP (MEF 61).

In June 2025, the MEF was renamed to the Mplify Alliance.

== MEF white papers ==
These white papers provide a comprehensive technical overview of MEF services, APIs, certification and new areas of work with MEF, based on the work of MEF's technical committees.

== Technical specifications ==
As of October 2020, MEF had approved and published 80 technical standards, including amendments, excluding superseded standards:

- MEF 2 Requirements and Framework for Ethernet Service Protection
- MEF 3 Circuit Emulation Service Definitions, Framework and Requirements in Metro Ethernet Networks
- MEF 4 Metro Ethernet Network Architecture Framework Part 1: Generic Framework
- MEF 6.2 EVC Ethernet Services Definitions Phase 3 (supersedes MEF 6.1)
- MEF 7.2 Carrier Ethernet Information Model (supersedes MEF 7.1 and MEF 7.1.1)
- MEF 8 Implementation Agreement for the Emulation of PDH Circuits over Metro Ethernet Networks
- MEF 9 Abstract Test Suite for Ethernet Services at the UNI
- MEF 10.3 Ethernet Services Attributes Phase 3 (supersedes MEF 10, MEF 10.1, MEF 10.1.1, MEF 10.2 and MEF 10.2.1)
- MEF 10.3.1 Composite Performance Metric (CPM) Amendment to MEF 10.3
- MEF 11 User Network Interface (UNI) Requirements and Framework
- MEF 12.1 Carrier Ethernet Network Architecture Framework Part 2: Ethernet Services Layer (supersedes MEF 12.1 and MEF 12.1.1)
- MEF 13 User Network Interface (UNI) Type 1 Implementation Agreement
- MEF 14 Abstract Test Suite for Traffic Management Phase 1
- MEF 15 Requirements for Management of Metro Ethernet Phase 1 Network Elements
- MEF 16 Ethernet Local Management Interface
- MEF 17 Service OAM Framework and Requirements
- MEF 18 Abstract Test Suite for Circuit Emulation Services
- MEF 19 Abstract Test Suite for UNI Type 1
- MEF 20 UNI Type 2 Implementation Agreement
- MEF 21 Abstract Test Suite for UNI Type 2 Part 1 Link OAM
- MEF 22.1 Mobile Backhaul Phase 2 Implementation Agreement (supersedes MEF 22)
- MEF 22.1.1 Amendment to MEF 22.1 – Small Cell Backhaul
- MEF 23.1 Class of Service Phase 2 Implementation Agreement (supersedes MEF 23)
- MEF 24 Abstract Test Suite for UNI Type 2 Part 2 E-LMI
- MEF 25 Abstract Test Suite for UNI Type 2 Part 3 Service OAM
- MEF 26.1 External Network Network Interface (ENNI)–Phase 2 (supersedes MEF 26, MEF 26.0.1, MEF 26.0.2 and MEF 26.0.3)
- MEF 27 Abstract Test Suite For UNI Type 2 Part 5: Enhanced UNI Attributes & Part 6: L2CP Handling
- MEF 28 External Network Network Interface (ENNI) Support for UNI Tunnel Access and Virtual UNI
- MEF 29 Ethernet Services Constructs
- MEF 30.1 Service OAM Fault Management Implementation Agreement Phase 2 (supersedes MEF 30)
- MEF 30.1.1 Amendment to SOAM FM IA
- MEF 31 Service OAM Fault Management Definition of Managed Objects
- MEF 32 Requirements for Service Protection Across External Interfaces
- MEF 33 Ethernet Access Services Definition
- MEF 34 ATS for Ethernet Access Services
- MEF 35 Service OAM Performance Monitoring Implementation Agreement (supersedes MEF 35)
- MEF 36.1 Service OAM SNMP MIB for Performance Monitoring (supersedes MEF 36)
- MEF 37 Abstract Test Suite for ENNI
- MEF 38 Service OAM Fault Management YANG Modules
- MEF 39 SOAM Performance Monitoring YANG Module
- MEF 40 UNI and EVC Definition of Managed Objects (SNMP)
- MEF 41 Generic Token Bucket Algorithm
- MEF 42 ENNI and OVC Definition of Managed Objects (SNMP)
- MEF 43 Virtual NID (vNID) Functionality for E-Access Services
- MEF 44 Virtual NID (vNID) Definition of Managed Objects (SNMP)
- MEF 45 Multi-CEN L2CP
- MEF 46 Latching Loopback Protocol and Functionality
- MEF 47 Carrier Ethernet Services for Cloud implementation Agreement
- MEF 48 Service Activation Testing
- MEF 49 Service Activation Testing Control Protocol and PDU Formats
- MEF 49.0.1 Amendment to Service Activation Testing Control Protocol and PDU Formats
- MEF 50 Service Operations Guidelines
- MEF 51 OVC Services Definitions
