= Imperva =

American cyber security company

Imperva, Inc.
- Type: Subsidiary
- Traded as: NYSE: IMPV (2011–2019)
- Industry: IT security
- Founded: 2002; 24 years ago
- Founders: Shlomo Kramer; Amichai Shulman; Mickey Boodaei
- Headquarters: San Mateo, California, United States
- Area served: Worldwide
- Key people: Pam Murphy (CEO)
- Products: Security software and services
- Owner: Thoma Bravo (2019–2023)
- Number of employees: 1,400 (2023)
- Parent: Thales Group (2023–present)
- Website: imperva.com

Imperva, Inc. was an American cyber security software and services company which provided protection to enterprise data and application software. The company is headquartered in San Mateo, California.

French multinational Thales Group acquired the company for approximately $3.6 billion from private equity firm Thoma Bravo in 2023.

== History ==
Imperva, originally named WebCohort, was founded in 2002 by Shlomo Kramer, Amichai Shulman and Mickey Boodaei. The following year the company shipped its first product, SecureSphere Web Application Database Protection, a web application firewall. In 2004, the company changed its name to Imperva.

In 2011, Imperva went public and was listed on the New York Stock Exchange (NYSE: IMPV). In August 2014, Imperva named Anthony Bettencourt as CEO. In 2016, it published a free scanner designed to detect devices infected with, or vulnerable to the Mirai botnet.

In February 2017, Imperva sold Skyfence to Forcepoint for $40 million. In August 2017, the company named Chris Hylen, the former CEO of Citrix GetGo, as its new president and CEO. Its former CEO, Anthony Bettencourt, resigned as chairman of the board of directors in February 2018. In 2018, Imperva identified a bug in Google Chrome which had been allowing attackers to steal information via HTML tags for audio and video files.

In 2019, Imperva was acquired by private equity firm Thoma Bravo. That same year, Imperva suffered a breach of its own when it notified customers that it learned about a security incident that exposed sensitive information for some users of Incapsula. CEO Chris Hylen left in October 2019 and Thoma Bravo Chairman of the Board, Charles Goodman, became interim CEO. In January 2020, Imperva named Pam Murphy as CEO.

In July 2023, Imperva agreed to be acquired by the French multinational Thales Group for $3.6 billion. The acquisition was completed on December 4, 2023.

=== Acquisitions ===
In 2014, Imperva acquired the complete shares of Incapsula, a cloud application security startup named SkyFence, and real-time mainframe security auditing assets from Tomium Software. In February 2017, the company purchased Camouflage, a data masking company.

In August 2018, Imperva acquired Prevoty, a runtime application self-protection (RASP) security company. In July 2019, it acquired Distil Networks for its bot management capabilities. In October 2020, Imperva acquired database security startup jSonar for an undisclosed amount.

=== Services ===
Imperva’s software stack contains products for both application and data security. It provides layered protection to ensure a company’s website located on-premises, in the cloud, or in a hybrid environment. The application security software includes Web Application Firewall (WAF), DDoS Protection, Runtime Application Self-Protection (RASP), API Security, bot management, Account Takeover (ATO) protection, attack analytics and application delivery; and the data security software includes Data Activity Monitoring (DAM), data risk analytics, data masking, discovery and assessment and file security.
