= Incapsula =

American cloud-based application delivery platform

Imperva Incapsula
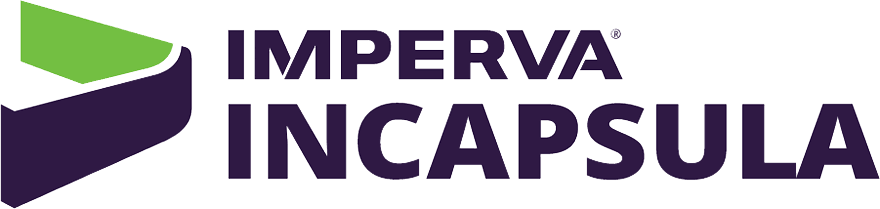
- Imperva Incapsula
- Founded: November 2009
- Founder: Gur Shatz; Marc Gaffan
- Headquarters: Redwood Shores, CA, United States
- Key people: Chris Hylen, CEO, Imperva
- Services: Website Performance; Security as a Service
- Parent: Imperva
- ASN: 19551
- Website: www.imperva.com

Imperva Incapsula is an American cloud-based application delivery platform. It uses a global content delivery network to provide web application security, DDoS mitigation, content caching, application delivery, load balancing and failover services.

== History ==
Incapsula was founded in 2009 by Gur Shatz and Marc Gaffan. The company has its origins in Imperva (NYSE:IMPV), an American-based cyber security firm which at the time owned 85% of Incapsula. It was spun out from Imperva in 2009. While reported to be growing at a rate of between 50%, 76% and 102% per quarter as of August 2013, the company lost over $1.7 million in the second quarter of that same year.

In February 2014 Imperva bought the remaining part of Incapsula and it became a product line within the parent company.

In 2013 Incapsula launched a tool named "Backdoor Protect". The tool is reported to detect and block malicious back-doors and "webshells". The tool works by comparing a website's traffic against a database of known back-doors. Later that year, the company announced a two factor authentication feature called Login-Protect, as an integrated feature of its products.

In October 2013 Incapsula was credited with having protected against one of the Internet's largest attacks on a website. The September 24, 2013, attack was said to have lasted nine hours with 100 Gbit/s of traffic at its peak. The attack was against BTC China, a bitcoin and yuan trading platform.

Incapsula also announced in 2013 that it would be implementing Layer 7 load balancing capabilities.

In December 2016 Incapsula reported that it had defended against the largest DDoS attack then recorded, which peaked at over 650 Gbit/s and 200Mpps.

== Service and features ==
Incapsula has multiple features that are used in the security and performance of websites:

- Application delivery control (ADC)
- Content delivery network (CDN)
- DDoS mitigation
- Global server load-balancing (GSLB)
- Web application firewall (WAF)

Incapsula WAF protects websites by changing their Domain Name System (DNS) records to route traffic through Incapsula. Incapsula then filters out malicious attacks from bots and website scrapers. As of 2011 it was effective against cross site scripting, illegal resource access and all other OWASP top 10 threats, SQL injections, and web 2.0 threats including academic web archiving, comment spam, fake registrations, malicious bots, referrer spam, and site scraping.

Incapsula also has a content delivery network that caches websites on their server network to speed up website load time. The cached information is returned from a server closest to the end user to provide fast page loads. This also allegedly militates against slow responses due to heavy server traffic.
