= Security appliance =

A security appliance is any form of server appliance that is designed to protect computer networks from unwanted traffic.

== Types of security appliances ==
- Active devices block unwanted traffic. Examples of such devices are firewalls, anti virus scanning devices, and content filtering devices.
- Passive devices detect and report on unwanted traffic, such as intrusion detection appliances.
- Preventative devices scan networks and identify potential security problems (such as penetration testing and vulnerability assessment appliances).
- Unified Threat Management (UTM) appliances combine features together into one system, such as some firewalls, content filtering, web caching etc.
