= Check Point =

Israeli security company

Check Point Software Technologies Ltd.

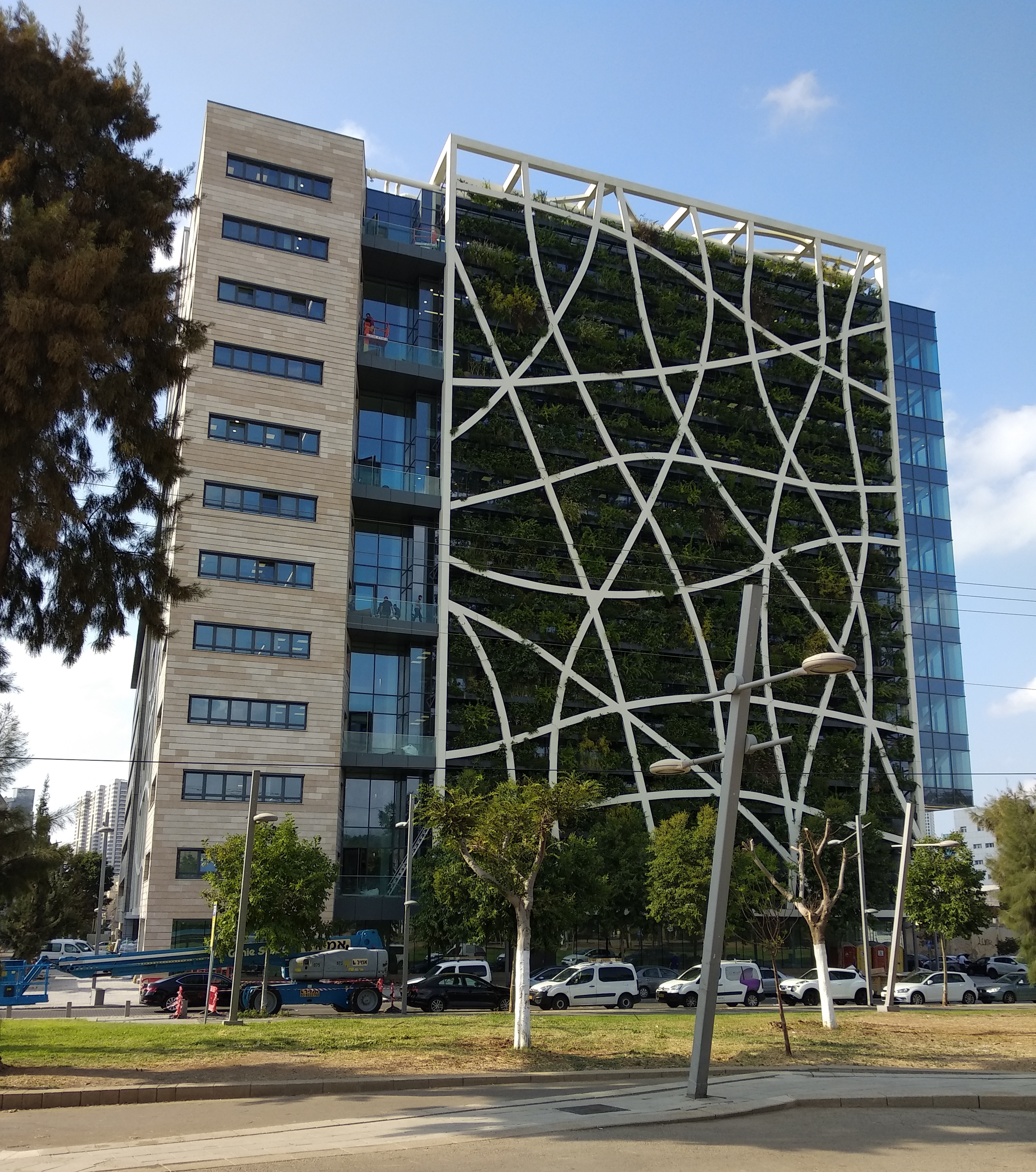
- In 2018, Check Point added a green wall to its headquarters in Tel Aviv.
- Type: Public
- Traded as: Nasdaq: CHKP
- Industry: Security software; Computer hardware
- Founded: 1993; 33 years ago in Ramat Gan, Israel
- Founders: Gil Shwed; Marius Nacht; Shlomo Kramer
- Headquarters: Tel Aviv, Israel
- Key people: Nadav Zafrir (CEO); Gil Shwed (Executive Chairman); Jonathan Zanger (Chief Technology Officer); Itai Greenberg (Chief Revenue Officer); Roi Karo (Chief Strategy Officer); Nataly Kremer (Chief Product Officer); Brett Theiss (Chief Marketing Officer); Roei Golan (Chief Financial Officer)
- Products: FireWall-1, VPN-1, UTM-1, Check Point Integrity, Intrusion prevention systems, End point security, Security appliances, Web application security, Mobile security, Cloud security, Security management Infinity Architecture
- Revenue: ▲US$2.725 billion (2025)
- Operating income: ▲US$831 million (2025)
- Net income: ▲US$1.05 billion (2025)
- Total assets: ▲US$7.8 billion (2025)
- Total equity: ▲US$2.88 billion (2025)
- Number of employees: 6,825 (2025)
- Subsidiaries: ZoneAlarm
- Website: checkpoint.com

Check Point Software Technologies Ltd. is an Israeli cybersecurity company, founded in 1993 by Gil Shwed, Marius Nacht and Shlomo Kramer, whose first product was the FireWall-1 firewall.

== History ==
Check Point was established in Ramat Gan, Israel in 1993 by Gil Shwed, Marius Nacht and Shlomo Kramer. Shwed had the initial idea for the company's core technology known as stateful inspection, which became the foundation for the company's first product, FireWall-1; soon afterwards, they also developed one of the world's first VPN products, VPN-1. Shwed developed the idea while serving in the Unit 8200 of the Israel Defense Forces, where he worked on securing classified networks.

Initial funding of US$250,000 was provided by venture capital fund BRM Group.

In 1994, Check Point signed an OEM agreement with Sun Microsystems, followed by a distribution agreement with HP in 1995.

By February 1996, the company was named "Worldwide Firewall Market Leader" by IDC, with a market share of 40 percent. In June 1996, Check Point raised $67 million from its initial public offering on NASDAQ.

In 1998, Check Point established a partnership with Nokia, which bundled Check Point's Software with Nokia's computer Network Security Appliances.

In 2003, a class-action lawsuit was filed against Check Point over violation of the Securities Exchange Act by failing to disclose major financial information.

Check Point acquired Nokia's network security business unit in 2009.

In 2018, the company discovered "AdultSwine" malware programmed into around 60 apps on the Google Play Store, primarily those aimed at children. The bug would display pornographic ads that, when clicked on, would instruct victims to download more malicious software in an attempt to steal personal data. It was estimated that between 3 and 7 million users may have been infected.

In 2019, researchers at Check Point found a security breach in Xiaomi phone apps. The security flaw was reported preinstalled.

As of December 2023, Check Point Software continues to operate in Russia, selling its cybersecurity products in the country. Despite the Russian invasion of Ukraine, the company has maintained its office in Moscow and has faced criticism for its decision to remain active in Russia.

In December 2024, Gil Shwed moved to become Executive Chairman of the Board of Check Point. Nadav Zafrir joined Check Point as the new Chief Executive Officer. In February 2026, together with its 2025 results, Check Point announced the acquisitions of three Israeli startups, Cyata, Cyclops and Rotate. No financial terms were disclosed; Globes cited market estimates of more than $150 million. In May 2026 it acquired the team and technology of Deepchecks, an Israeli AI evaluation startup.

== Acquisitions ==
List of acquisitions by Check Point over time
Date	Acquisition	Added value	Reference
2004	Zone Labs	Endpoint Security	
2009	Nokia Security	Enterprise Network Security	
2015	Hyperwise	Threat Prevention	
2018	Dome 9	Cloud Security Posture	
2021	Avanan	Cloud Email Security	
2023	Perimeter 81	SASE/SSE Platform	
2023	Atmosec	Software as a Service platform	
2024	Cyberint	External Risk Management	
2025	Veriti	Threat Management	
2025	Lakera	AI Cybersecurity	
2026	Cyclops Security	Exposure Management	
2026	Cyata	AI Agent Security	
2026	Rotate (team)	Workspace Security for MSPs	
2026	Deepchecks (team and technology)	AI Validation	

== Products ==
=== Quantum Force Firewalls ===
Quantum is Check Point’s line of network firewalls. Quantum Remote Access VPN provides remote access to an organization’s network resources.

According to Check Point, Quantum Force firewalls block malicious traffic, and its AI Security Management can respond automatically when threats are identified.

=== Harmony ===
Harmony is a cloud security platform that combines firewall-as-a-service (FWaaS), secure web gateway, zero-trust network access (ZTNA), SaaS protection, and SD-WAN. According to Check Point, it uses the company’s ThreatCloud AI to detect malware, phishing and anomalous behavior.

- According to the press, the hybrid security architecture, combining on-device and cloud-based protections, is designed to improve access speed, support reliable connectivity, and enhance visibility into SaaS applications.

=== CloudGuard ===
CloudGuard is Check Point’s cloud security product line, covering applications, networks and workloads.

According to Check Point, CloudGuard Network Security protects against network evasion techniques.

CloudGuard WAF is a web application firewall that Check Point says uses contextual AI rather than signatures to block attacks, including exploits of the Log4j and MOVEit vulnerabilities.

A partnership between Check Point and cloud security provider Wiz, announced in February 2025, replaces CloudGuard CNAPP with Wiz’s offering inside the CloudGuard suite.

=== Infinity External Risk Management ===
Infinity External Risk Management is a product that monitors for external threats such as credential theft, fraud and brand impersonation. Check Point integrated Veriti, which it acquired in 2025, into the platform.

== Check Point Research ==
The Check Point research team consists of over 200 analysts and researchers cooperating with other security vendors, law enforcement and various CERTs. Their data sources include open sources, the ThreatCloud AI network and dark web intelligence.

In 2020, the Check Point Research team uncovered multiple vulnerabilities in the TikTok app that exposed users to having personal information scraped from their profile, including their phone number and profile settings. That information could have been used to manipulate users' account details and build a database of TikTok users for malicious activity. The company notified TikTok and a fix was deployed to solve this.

In mid-2025, Check Point Research identified six Windows vulnerabilities, including one rated as critical, which could crash systems, allow attackers to run malicious code, or expose sensitive data. The flaws were privately reported to Microsoft under a responsible disclosure process and Microsoft issued fixes for the vulnerability in August.

== SofaWare legal battle ==
SofaWare Technologies was founded in 1999, as a cooperation between Check Point and SofaWare's founders, Adi Ruppin and Etay Bogner, with the purpose of extending Check Point from the enterprise market to the small business, consumer and branch office market. SofaWare's co-founder Adi Ruppin said that his company wanted to make the technology simple to use and affordable, and to lift the burden of security management from end users while adding some features. In 2001 SofaWare began selling firewall appliances under the SofaWare S-Box brand; in 2002 the company started selling the Safe@Office and Safe@Home line of security appliances, under the Check Point brand. By the fourth quarter of 2002 sales of SofaWare's Safe@Office firewall/VPN appliances had increased greatly, and SofaWare held the #1 revenue position in the worldwide firewall/VPN sub-$490 appliance market, with a 38% revenue market share.

Relations between Check Point and the SofaWare founders went sour after the company acquisition in 2002. In 2004 Etay Bogner, co-founder of SofaWare, sought court approval to file a shareholder derivative suit, claiming Check Point was not transferring funds to SofaWare as required for its use of SofaWare's products and technology. His derivative suit was ultimately successful, and Check Point was ordered to pay SofaWare 13 million shekels for breach of contract. In 2006 the Tel Aviv District Court Judge ruled that Bogner SofaWare could sue Check Point by proxy for $5.1 million in alleged damage to SofaWare. Bogner claimed that Check Point, which owned 60% of Sofaware, had behaved belligerently, and withheld money due for use of SofaWare technology and products Check Point appealed the ruling, but lost.

In 2009 the Israeli Supreme Court ruled that a group of founders of SofaWare, which includes Bogner, had veto power over any decision of SofaWare. The court ruled that the three founders could exercise their veto power only as a group and by majority rule.

In 2011 Check Point settled all litigation relating to SofaWare. As part of the settlement it acquired the SofaWare shares held by Bogner and Ruppin, and began a process of acquiring the remaining shares, resulting in SofaWare becoming a wholly owned subsidiary.

== See also ==
- Economy of Israel
- Silicon Wadi
