= Batten (surname) =

Batten is a surname. Notable people with the surname include:

- Adrian Batten (c.1591–c.1637), English composer
- Amanda Batten (born 1979), American politician from Virginia
- Andy Batten-Foster (born 1953), British television producer and director
- Ann Batten (born 1944), New Zealand politician, activist and Anglican priet
- Annie Mottram Craig Batten (1883–1964), Canadian singer and composer
- Anne K. Batten (born 1932), American politician from Vermont
- Annie Mottram Craig Batten, Canadian-born American singer, voice teacher
- Anthony J. Batten (1940–2020), Canadian visual artist
- Archibald G. M. Batten (1902–1996), British insurance executive and philatelist
- Arthur Batten-Pooll (1891–1971), English recipient of the Victoria Cross
- Auriol Batten (1918–2015), South African botanical illustrator
- Bert Batten (1898–1956), English footballer
- Billy Batten (1889–1959), English rugby league footballer
- Charles Lynn Batten born 1942), American literary critic and academic
- Chris Batten, English bassist and a vocalist for Enter Shikari
- Cyia Batten (born 1972), American dancer and actor
- Danny Batten (born 1987), American football player
- Dave Batten (1926–2013), New Zealand sprinter
- David J. Batten (1943–2019), British palynologist
- Diana Batten, Canadian politician from Alberta
- Edith Batten (1905–1985), British welfare worker and educationist
- Edmund Chisholm Batten (1817–1897), British antiquarian and legal author
- Eric Batten (1914–1993), English rugby union and rugby league footballer
- Frank Batten (1927–2009), American businessman
- Frederick Batten (1865–1918), English neurologist and pediatrician
- George Batten (advertiser) (1854–1918), American advertising executive
- George Batten (baseball) (1891–1972), American baseball player
- George W. Batten (1856–1922), American businessman and politician
- Gerard Batten (born 1954), British politician
- Guin Batten (born 1967), British rower, sister of Miriam
- Haley Batten (born 1998), American cross-country mountain biker
- Herman Maxwell Batten (1909–1991), Canadian educator and politician
- Horace Batten (1912–2014), English shoemaker and bootmaker
- Jack Batten (born 1932), Canadian writer and broadcaster
- James Batten (1936–1995), American journalist and publisher
- Jean Batten (1909–1982), New Zealand aviator
- Jennifer Batten (born 1957), American electric guitar player
- John Batten (actor) (1903–1993), New Zealand actor
- John Batten (physician) (1924–2013), British physician
- John Batten (rugby union) (1853–1917), English rugby union footballer
- John D. Batten (1860–1932), English illustrator
- John Mount Batten (1843–1916), British soldier and landowner
- John Winterbotham Batten (1831–1901), English barrister and railway company director
- Jennifer Batten, guitarist and author
- Jimmy Batten (born 1955), British boxer
- Joseph Batten (1778–1837), English academic administrator
- Juliet Batten (born 1942), New Zealand performance artist and therapist
- Karen Batten (born 1958), American schoolteacher and Second Lady of the US
- Karen Lee Batten, country music singer
- Kim Batten (born 1969), American hurdler
- Lynn Batten (1948–2022), Canadian–Australian mathematician and author
- Mabel Batten (1856–1916), British composer and singer
- Malcolm Batten (born 1964), Australian rower
- Mary Batten (born 1937), American writer of science books
- Mary John Batten (1921–2015), Canadian lawyer, judge and political figure from Saskatchewan
- Matthew Batten (born 1995), American baseball player
- Miriam Batten (born 1964), British rower
- Norman Batten (1893–1928), American racecar driver
- Orlando B. Batten (c. 1855–1920), American lawyer and politician in the Montana and Idaho territories
- Percy H. Batten (1877–1960), American industrialist
- Ray Batten (1945–2020), English rugby league footballer
- Raymond A. Batten, American attorney and politician from New Jersey
- Richard Lindsey Batten (1920–1997), English surgeon
- Samuel Zane Batten (1859–1925), American Baptist minister and educator
- Shawn Batten (born 1971), American soap opera actress
- Susan Batten, American soap opera actress
- Thomas Batten (born 1955), American politician from Nevada
- Timothy Batten (born 1960), American judge from Georgia
- William Batten, (c.1601–1667), English naval officer and administrator
- William M. Batten (1909–1999), American businessman

== See also ==
- Batten (disambiguation)
- Batten Twins, American wrestling tag team
