= Sal Maccarone =

American sculptor

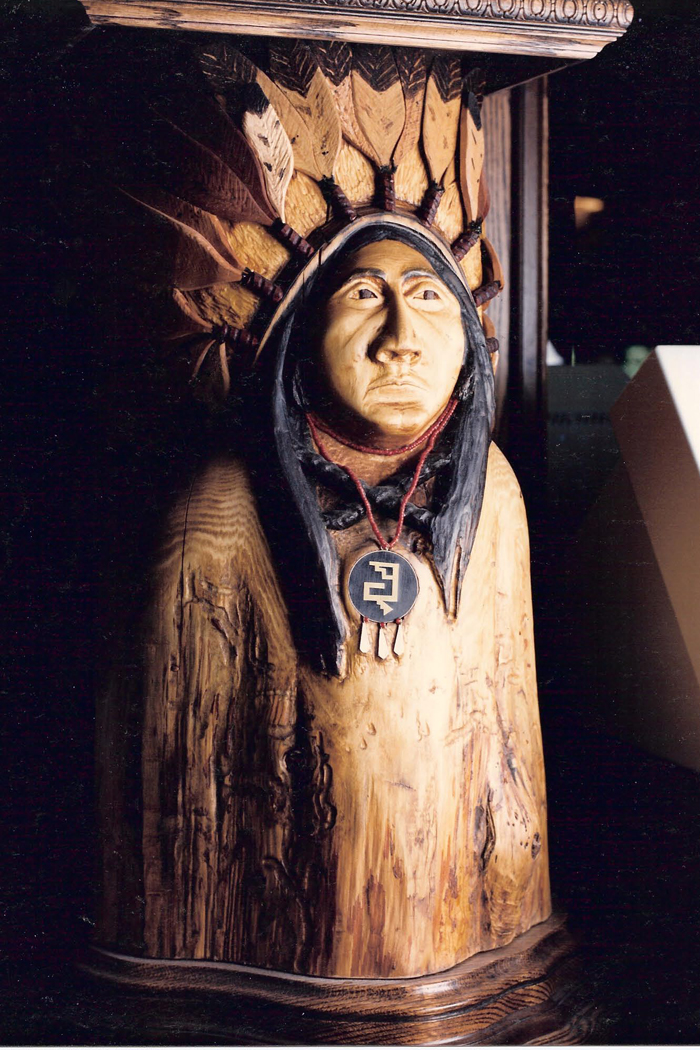
- A 1990 Sal Maccarone sculpture, commissioned for the Tenaya Lodge in Yosemite National Park
- Born: Salvatore Maccarone; August 11, 1949 (age 77); Lawrence, Massachusetts, U.S.
- Education: San Jose State University
- Occupations: Author, furniture maker, sculptor
- Years active: 1972–present

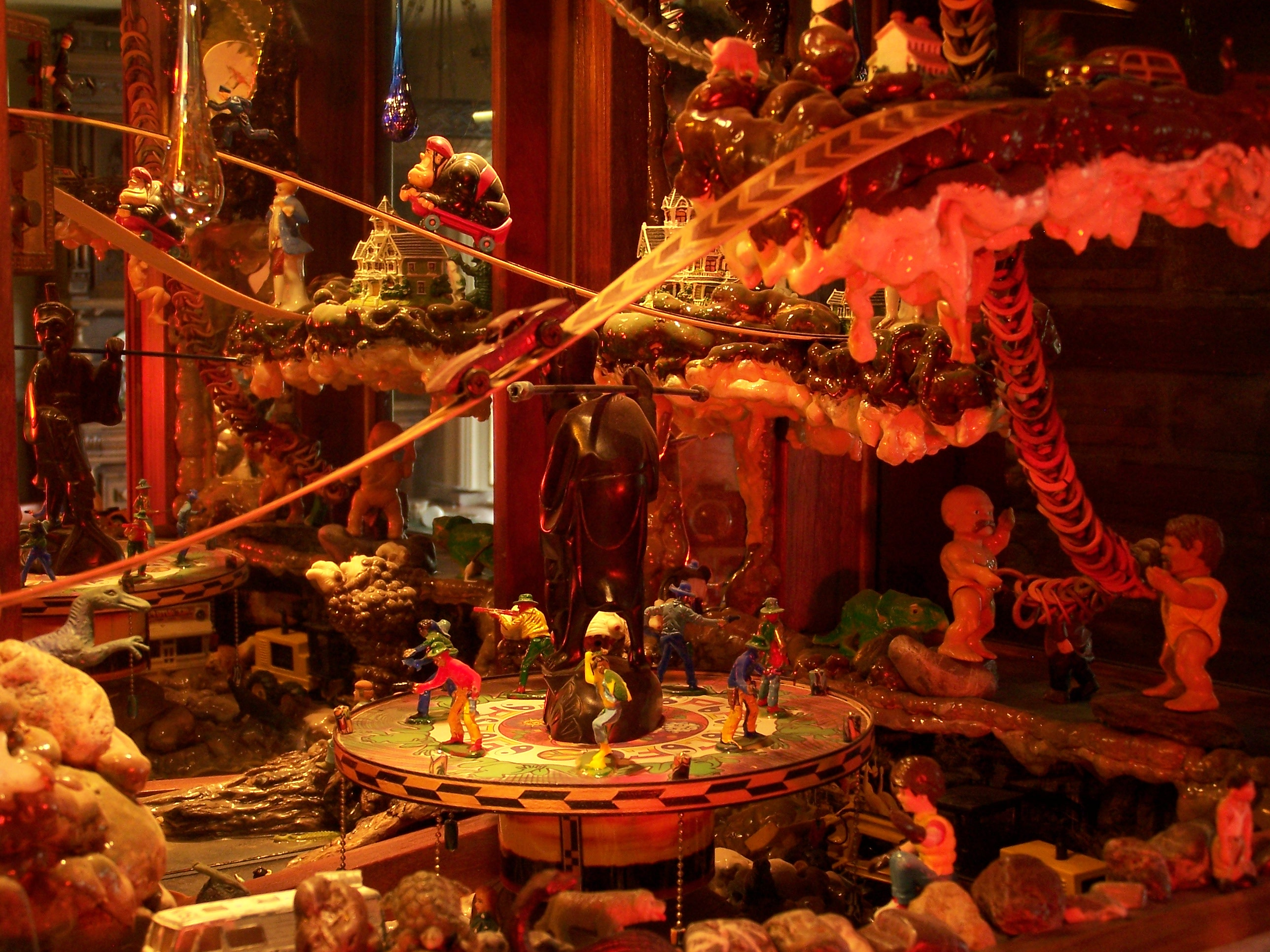
"A Sequence of Sensations", 2001 Sal Maccarone kinetic sculpture. Wood, glass, ceramics, metal, and paint. Los Angeles, California

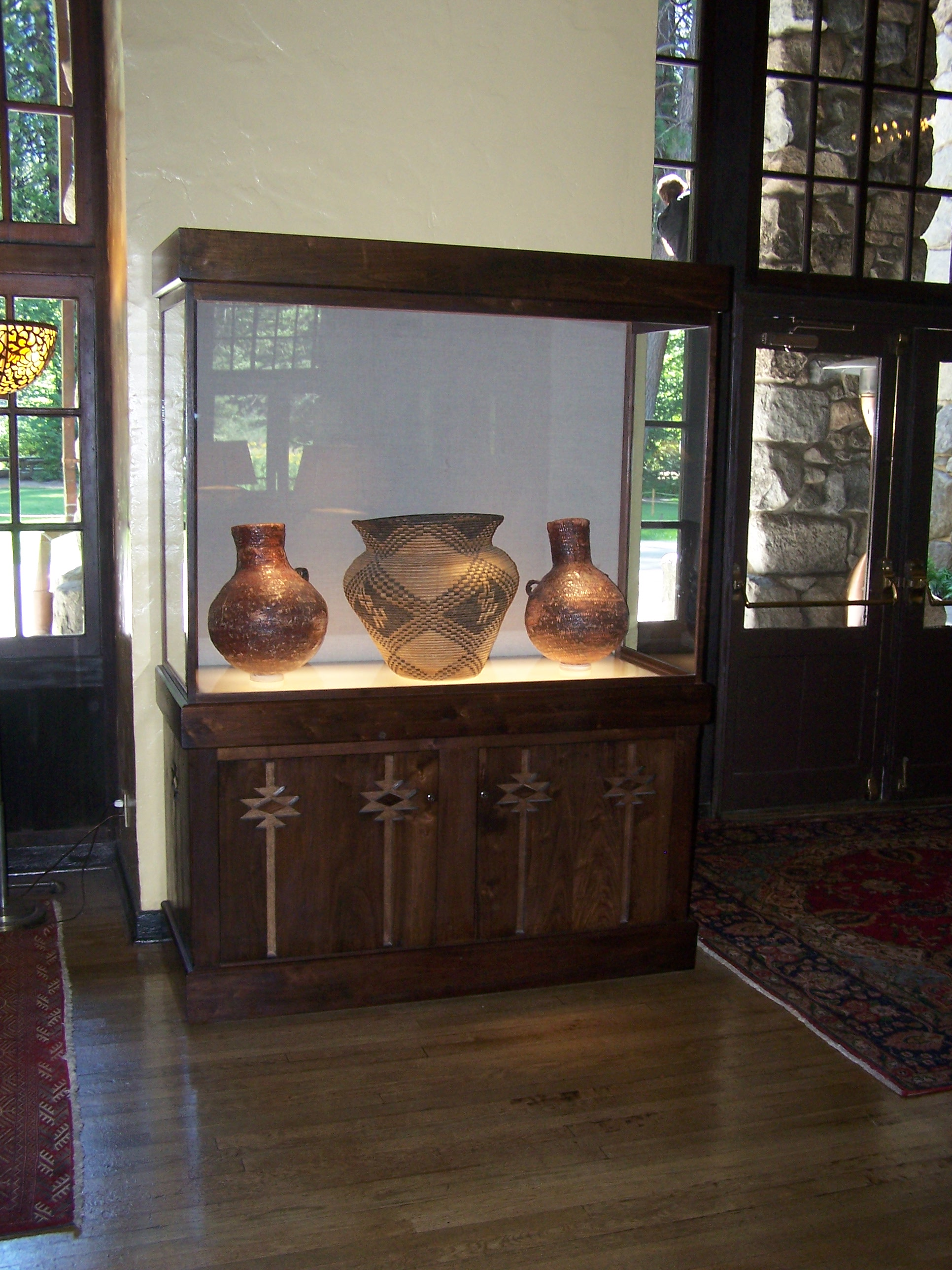
Wood & glass display case designed and built in 2010 by Sal Maccarone for the Ahwahnee Hotel in Yosemite National Park

Sal Maccarone is an American author, sculptor, designer and kinetic artist. He is best known as a master craftsman, and for his internationally distributed woodworking books such as Tune Up Your Tools, and How to Make $40,000 a Year Woodworking, both published by F & W publications, Betterway Books, in Cincinnati, Ohio. He is also known for his woodworking technique articles published both online since 1994, Article. and by the national magazine Popular Woodworking. Article. Articles such as his "Evolution of an Entryway" have also been published in industry specific journals.

He attended San José State University and achieved a Bachelor of Fine Arts degree in 1972. During 1973 and 1974 while enrolled in the Master of Fine Arts Program for sculpture at (SJSU), he studied under professors Sam Richardson, John Battenberg, and Fletcher Benton, all internationally recognized sculptors.

While studying for his master's degree in sculpture Sal became involved in the kinetic sculpture movement of the 1970s. Always using wood as the main media for his sculpture, he also incorporates metal, glass, plastic, and natural stone. His meticulously engineered kinetic sculptures are best described as a combination of fine furniture pieces which contain an impossible bottle type environment that is viewed through glass. The cabinet always remains stationary while the artwork within is kinetic. When turned on, the pieces sequenced with a combination of light and mechanical movement. Video.

He gained national recognition for his furniture, and sculpture in 1977 when he and his work were featured on the KPIX-TV program Evening Magazine. Video. He was the co-founder of Bears in the Wood a small chain of retail stores in the San Francisco Bay Area which served as the showrooms for furniture that he both designed and built. The stores also sold Teddy bears which were imported from around the world. The merchandise was displayed within an environment which featured a three-story waterfall, and a full scale log cabin. These were the first stores in the country to market "just" Teddy Bears. The airing of that TV special set off a national Teddy Bear store frenzy in the United States from coast to coast which began in 1976, and continues until the present.

In 1979 his work was featured in the Fine Woodworking "Design Book Two" printed by the Taunton Press. This hardcover book featured photographs of the best work in wood by selected craftsmen from across the United States, and Canada.

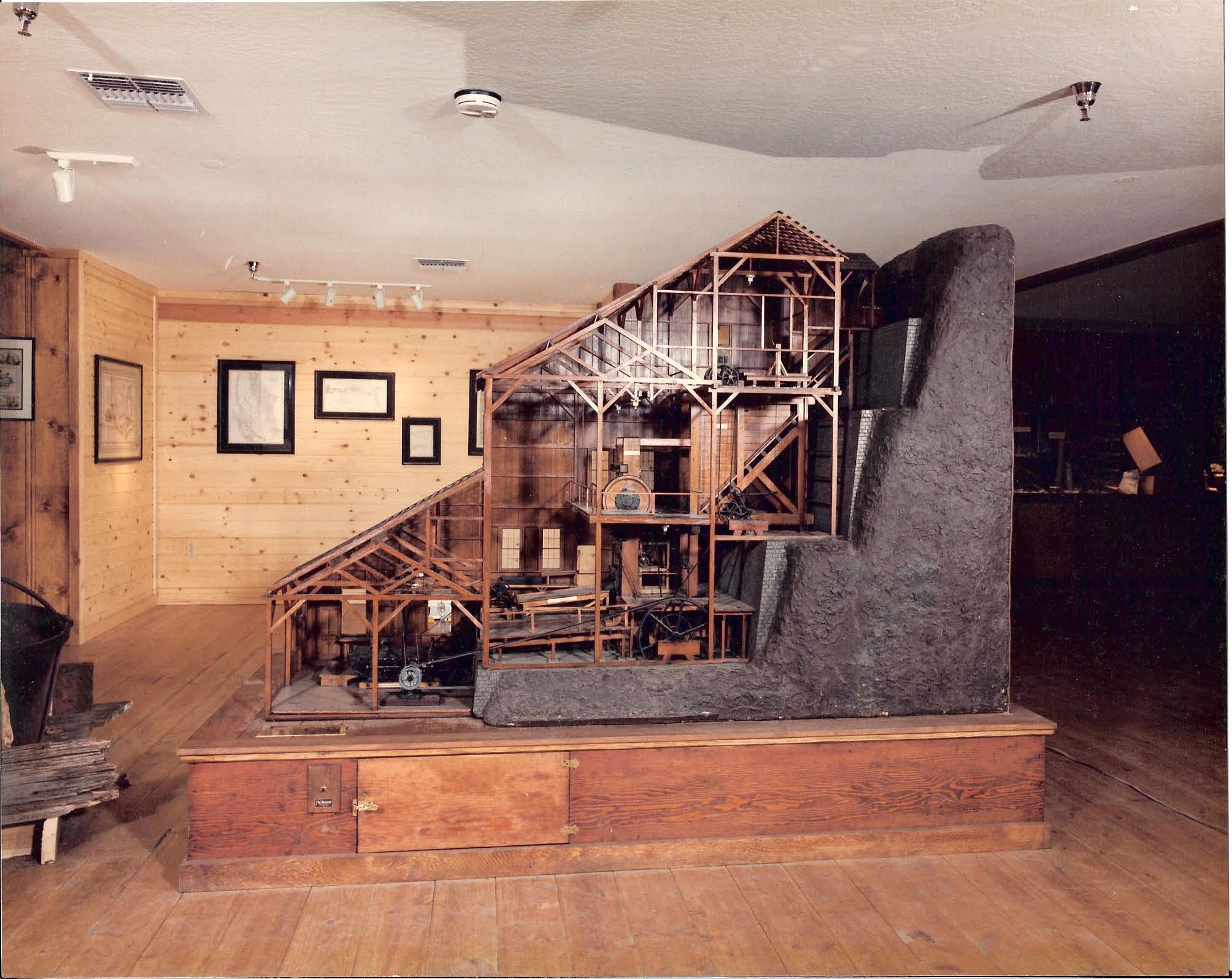
Working model of a "gold stamp mill" built by sculptor Sal Maccarone

During 1985 Sal was commissioned by the "California State Mining and Mineral Association" to build a working scale model of a California Gold Rush era "Gold Stamp Mill". The model currently resides at the California State Mining and Mineral Museum in Mariposa, California.

In 1990 his woodwork, and sculpture at the Tenaya Lodge in Yosemite was featured first in the Fresno Bee newspaper, and then on the KGPE CBS TV47 program, Eye on the Valley. Video. The program was filmed at Sal's studio in Mariposa, California in March 1990.

In early 1990 Maccarone began furniture design, and construction for the Chateau du Sureau in Oakhurst, California. Over a period of eighteen months he worked very closely with the hotel owner to ultimately produce eighty different period pieces of furniture, and the castle's Honduras mahogany doors. During the process Sal perfected the distressing process which visually ages the woodwork. Part of that unique process involved using a small gauge shotgun. By glancing the shot at an angle, he discovered that it was possible to simulate worm holes in the faces of the wooden doors.

Beginning in 1997, after the publication of his first national woodworking book, he began teaching woodworking technique. Touring the country with The Woodworking Shows, a Los Angeles-based traveling trade organization, he gave three-day woodworking seminars in twenty-one different US cities each season. He continued teaching and traveling the country on an average of twice each month until October 2002.

In 2009 he began a syndicated newspaper column called, "How Art Shapes Our Lives". The column is published once each week in the California central valley, Sierra foothills, and the Yosemite area. The column is designed to help build an awareness of the fine arts and the "Bigger Picture" while pointing to something local that can be observed. Article archives.

In 2010 he designed and built the two wood and glass display cases which reside as part of the permanent collection in the Great Lounge of the Ahwahnee Hotel. These furniture pieces were the first new additions to grace the Great Lounge since 1927. Both matching cases are made of native walnut and are primarily used to display the historic baskets made by the Miwok people who once lived in Yosemite Valley. In 2011 the display cases were designated as "Reserve Property" of the hotel and are now part of the United States national heritage.

He has been in the business of designing and building commissioned pieces of furniture, and sculpture since 1972. His woodwork and kinetic sculpture can be viewed in many public, and private collections throughout the United States, and British Columbia. Article. His woodwork portfolio has been used as reference within the Marriott International interior design library system since 1990.

As a member of the American Institute for Conservation he has also served as a conservator of furniture for the Ahwahnee Hotel in Yosemite National Park, and has helped to preserve such National treasures as the three Craftsman style harvest tables which were built in 1926 by L & J.G. Stickley especially for the hotel.
