= Batten (disambiguation) =

A batten is a piece of construction material.

Batten may also refer to:

- Batten (surname), for people named Batten
- Batten (car), a British automobile produced in the 1930s
- Batten (theater), a horizontal pole from which lights, props or curtains may be hung
- Batten disease, a disorder of the nervous system
- Batten Kill, an American river that rises in Vermont and flows into New York
- Batten Kill Railroad, a class III railroad operating in New York
- Mount Batten, an outcrop of rock at Plymouth Sound in England
- Sail batten, a flexible insert in a sail to help shape it as an airfoil
- BBDO (Batten, Barton, Durstine & Osborn), an American advertising agency
- Batten Rouge, the No Place counterpart of Rouge the Bat from Sonic Prime

== See also ==
- Baton (disambiguation)
- Battenberg (disambiguation)
- Mountbatten (disambiguation)
