= Lindsey Willett Batten =

British physician (1889–1981)

Lindsey Willett Batten (1889–1981) was an English medical doctor, known as a general practitioner, lecturer and author.

== Life ==
He was born in London, the son of Rayner D. Batten MD and his wife Katharine, daughter of Eustace Condor; he was a grandson of John Winterbotham Batten and nephew of Frederick Batten. He was educated at Blundell's School, and in 1907 won an exhibition at Sidney Sussex College, Cambridge. At Cambridge Batten sang in the chorus for the The Wasps, the 1909 Cambridge Greek Play with incidental music by Vaughan Williams, with William Denis Browne and Steuart Wilson.

Batten was a medical student at St Bartholomew's Hospital (Barts), at a period when John Hannah Drysdale was the dominant teacher; later his major influence on practice was Walter Langdon-Brown. He qualified as a doctor in September 1914, at the beginning of World War I. He then had a war-related position at Barts for a year, where he was a house officer and medical receiving officer, as well as paediatric clinical assistant.

=== RAMC ===
Batten joined the Royal Army Medical Corps in 1915, where he had the rank of captain, and remained to 1919. He served in France as a Field Ambulance Officer and Regimental Medical Officer. He was involved in the Somme Campaign of 1916, and was ill with typhoid. He wrote that it was "easily the messiest, untidiest and most insanitary (though not the muddiest) battleground of the war". In 1918 he was attached to the headquarters of the 1st/5th Battalion, King's Own Yorkshire Light Infantry.

=== Later life ===
Batten returned to Barts, as a paediatrician, and also became assistant physician at the East London Hospital for Children. He chose not to become a consultant, and went into general practice. He was physician to G. D. H. Cole, a diabetic. He first knew Cole's children as a family doctor; Cole was his patient from 1924 for the rest of his life. In the medical certificate debate that accompanied the start of the National Health Service, Batten commented on the government's treatment of doctors as "technical labour", in connection with their effective "monopoly in knowledge and understanding of medicine".

Batten was a founder member of the Royal College of General Practitioners (RCGP) in 1952. He retired from practice around 1963, and became a Fellow of the Royal College of Physicians in 1964, and a Fellow of the RCGP in 1969.

== Works ==
- The Single-Handed Mother (1939), preface by H. G. Wells, at that time "forecasting trends in modern life", for "mothers who were trying to raise babies without the assistance of nannies or maids in this increasingly servantless modern world". The British Medical Journal commented "Dr. Batten's style is clear, his teaching definite and rational". A positive review in The Lancet said also "he has written a book for the mother who has friends and relatives who can help her, a loyal domestic staff and perhaps an untrained nursemaid. The real single-handed mother is married to a labourer, has five children and no outside help, and probably she could enlighten us all on the management of children; but that doesn't alter the fact that Dr. Batten could give her a great deal of useful information in return – and does in this book."
- Health For The Young (1941). A review that year by V. M. Jeans, a graduate of the Bergman Österberg Physical Training College, stated:

Two main points emerge from this excellent book by Dr. Batten; the first that health should be positive and not merely freedom from illness; the second that, although heredity, environment and food play a large part in the growth of the young, it is the state of mind and mental outlook that finally influences their way of life.

- Essence of General Practice (1958), lecture delivered to Final Year students at St. Bartholomew's Hospital on 1 November, 1955; commended by John Horder on the occasion of Batten's 90th birthday. In his obituary of Batten, Horder wrote of his "generalist" position as comprising "broad scope, accessibility, integration in assessment and continuous personal care." He was an opponent of group medical practice. His own standards of practice, according to Horder, were "austere".
- Seventh James Mackenzie Lecture for the RCGP (1960). Under the title "The Medical Adviser", Batten spoke about the need to reassure mothers of young children. He cited Edward Maurice Backett on the threat to the traditional role of the general practitioner. He gave "passionate support of the values of the family doctor", and received a standing ovation.
- Teach Yourself Physical Fitness (1963)

Batten contributed to The Lancet, Nursing Mirror, and St Bartholomew's Hospital Journal, in which he attacked in 1940 the slogan "safety first" in paediatrics.

== Family ==
Batten married in 1919, at Essex Church, Ellen Mary Turnbull (1891–1980), daughter of Dr. George Lindsay Turnbull. The couple had two sons and three daughters. Richard Lindsey Batten was one of the sons. He was a contemporary at university and medical school of Ernest Connor Bantry White, husband of P. D. James; and James in 1944 ahead of the birth of her second child was a guest of the Battens in Hampstead. In later life they moved to Crockham Hill.
