= Web application firewall =

HTTP specific network security system

A Web application firewall (WAF) is a specific form of application firewall that filters, monitors, and blocks HTTP traffic to and from a web service. By inspecting HTTP traffic, it can prevent attacks exploiting a Web application's known vulnerabilities, such as SQL injection, cross-site scripting (XSS), file inclusion, and improper system configuration. Financial institutions often utilize WAFs to help in the mitigation of Web application zero-day vulnerabilities, as well as hard-to-patch bugs or weaknesses through custom attack signature strings.

== History ==
Dedicated Web application firewalls entered the market in the late 1990s during a time when web server attacks were becoming more prevalent.

Early WAF products, from Kavado and Gilian technologies, tried to solve the increasing amount of attacks on Web applications in the late 1990s. In 2002, the open-source project ModSecurity was formed in order to make WAF technology more accessible. They finalized a core rule set for protecting Web applications, based on OASIS Web Application Security Technical Committee’s (WAS TC) vulnerability work. In 2003, they expanded and standardized rules through the Open Web Application Security Project’s (OWASP) Top 10 List, an annual ranking for Web security vulnerabilities. This list would become the industry standard for Web application security compliance.

Since then, the market has continued to grow and evolve, especially focusing on credit card fraud prevention. With the development of the Payment Card Industry Data Security Standard (PCI DSS), a standardization of control over cardholder data, security has become more regulated in this sector.

== Description ==
A Web application firewall is a special type of application firewall that applies specifically to Web applications. It is deployed in front of Web applications and analyzes bi-directional web-based (HTTP) traffic – detecting and blocking anything malicious. The OWASP provides a broad technical definition for a WAF as “a security solution on the Web application level which – from a technical point of view – does not depend on the application itself”. According to the PCI DSS Information Supplement for requirement 6.6, a WAF is defined as “a security policy enforcement point positioned between a Web application and the client endpoint. This functionality can be implemented in software or hardware, running in an appliance device, or in a typical server running a common operating system. It may be a stand-alone device or integrated into other network components.” In other words, a WAF can be a virtual or physical appliance that prevents vulnerabilities in Web applications from being exploited by outside threats. These vulnerabilities may be because the application itself is a legacy type or was insufficiently coded by design. The WAF addresses these code shortcomings by special configurations of rule-sets, also known as policies.

Previously unknown vulnerabilities can be discovered through penetration testing or via a vulnerability scanner. A Web application vulnerability scanner, also known as a web application security scanner, is defined in the SAMATE NIST 500-269 as “an automated program that examines Web applications for potential security vulnerabilities. In addition to searching for Web application-specific vulnerabilities, the tools also look for software coding errors.” Resolving vulnerabilities is commonly referred to as remediation. Corrections to the code can be made in the application, but typically a more prompt response is necessary. In these situations, the application of a custom policy for a unique Web application vulnerability to provide a temporary but immediate fix (known as a virtual patch) may be necessary.

WAFs are not an ultimate security solution, rather they are meant to be used in conjunction with other network perimeter security solutions such as network firewalls and intrusion prevention systems to provide a holistic defense strategy.

WAFs typically follow a positive security model, a negative security, or a combination of both as mentioned by the SANS Institute. WAFs use a combination of rule-based logic, parsing, and signatures to detect and prevent attacks such as cross-site scripting and SQL injection. In general, features like browser emulation, obfuscation and virtualization, and IP obfuscation are used to attempt to bypass WAFs. The OWASP produces a list of the top ten Web application security flaws. All commercial WAF offerings cover these ten flaws at a minimum. There are non-commercial options as well. As mentioned earlier, the well-known open-source WAF engine called ModSecurity is one of these options. A WAF engine alone is insufficient to provide adequate protection, therefore OWASP along with Trustwave's Spiderlabs help organize and maintain a Core-Rule Set via GitHub to use with the ModSecurity WAF engine.

== Deployment options ==
Although the names for operating mode may differ, WAFs are basically deployed inline in three different ways. According to NSS Labs, deployment options are transparent bridge, transparent reverse proxy, and reverse proxy. "Transparent" refers to the fact that the HTTP traffic is sent straight to the Web application, therefore the WAF is transparent between the client and server. This is in contrast to reverse proxy, where the WAF acts as a proxy, and the client’s traffic is sent directly to the WAF. The WAF then separately sends filtered traffic to Web applications. This can provide additional benefits such as IP masking but may introduce disadvantages such as performance latencies.

== JA3 fingerprint ==
JA3, developed by Salesforce in 2017, is a technique for generating a unique fingerprint for SSL/TLS traffic based on specific fields in the handshake, such as the version, cipher suites, and extensions used by the client. This fingerprint enables the identification and tracking of clients based on the characteristics of their encrypted traffic. In the context of distributed denial of service (DDoS) protection, JA3 fingerprints are used to detect and differentiate malicious traffic, often associated with attack bots, from legitimate traffic, allowing for more precise filtering of potential threats. In September 2023, AWS WAF announced built-in support for JA3, enabling customers to inspect the JA3 fingerprints of incoming requests. JA3 was deprecated in May 2025 in favor of JA4. JA4 is currently patent pending.

== See also ==
- Payment Card Industry Data Security Standard (PCI DSS)
- Web application
- Software as a service (SaaS)
- Computer security
- Network security
- Application security
- Web application security
- Firewall
