= Stickley =

Stickley is a surname. Notable people with the surname include:

- Arnold Stickley (1926–1998), English golfer
- Gustav Stickley (1858–1942), American furniture manufacturer, design leader, and publisher
- Jim Stickley, American businessman
- Jon Stickley, American guitarist
