= Mount Batten (disambiguation) =

Mount Batten is an outcrop of rock on a peninsula in Plymouth Sound, Devon, England, named after Sir William Batten.

Mount Batten or Mountbatten may refer to:

- RAF Mount Batten, a former Royal Air Force station and flying boat base located on Mount Batten
- Mountbatten family, a European dynasty
- Mountbatten, Singapore, a neighbourhood located in the planning area of Marine Parade
  - Mountbatten MRT station, in Singapore
- Earl Mountbatten of Burma, a title in the Peerage of the United Kingdom

== See also ==
- Category:Mountbatten family
- Mount (disambiguation)
- Batten (disambiguation)
- Battenberg (disambiguation)
