= TraceSecurity =

American cybersecurity company

TraceSecurity, LLC
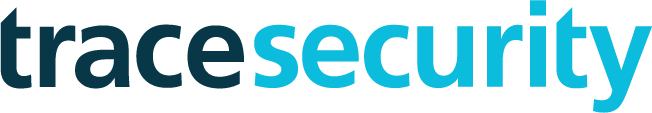
- Type: Private
- Founder: Peter Stewart, Jim Stickley
- Headquarters: Baton Rouge, Louisiana, United States
- Key people: Paul McCown, CEO
- Products: TraceCSO, TraceInsight
- Website: https://www.tracesecurity.com/

TraceSecurity is a cybersecurity company that provides cloud-based IT governance and risk management products for organizations.

Peter Stewart and Jim Stickley founded TraceSecurity in 2003. The firm is based in Baton Rouge, Louisiana, United States, with executive offices in Los Gatos, California. Paul McCown is CEO.

== History ==
TraceSecurity was founded in 2003 by Peter Stewart and Jim Stickley. Stickley wrote The Truth About Identity Theft and created a series of informative videos to help protect the public from various types of fraud and security exploits.

In October 2012, TraceSecurity launched TraceCSO, a cloud-based software system. Lake Trust Credit Union was an early adopter of TraceCSO who used the software system to track remediation processes and assure that the financial institution was in line with risk-compliance responsibilities. The purpose of the software was to streamline compliance regulations and policy adherence for organizations. TraceCSO provided a single point of aggregation for risk and compliance management as well as process management to provide a more comprehensive view of risk and compliance across all IT systems. The software focuses on centralizing and integrating key functional areas including, risk management, auditing, governance and compliance reporting as well as specific areas of policy, process, training, vendor, and vulnerability management. TraceCSO uses wizards where possible to assist users of any skill level through setup and usage. The initial setup process guides the user through the set up of departments, roles, users, network scanning, and authority documents. Once setup is complete, the software system performs a holistic risk assessment to identify assets and threats.

TraceSecurity partnered with Qualys in 2013 to integrate products and create a cloud-based GRC package. The company also launched a phishing simulator in 2013. The simulator allowed organizations to evaluate the effectiveness of existing information and security policies, determine how well employees adhere to internet security procedures when presented with a phishing email, assess the level of security awareness among employees, and identify areas for remediation. The phishing simulator was listed as product of the week on April 1, 2013 on Network World.

In 2014, TraceSecurity entered a joint product agreement with GFI Software. GFI Software is one of the world’s largest providers of IT solutions for small to mid-sized businesses. The same year TraceSecurity partnered with Rackspace, a cloud hosting provider. The partnership was designed to increase exposure of TraceCSO to Rackspace users. In October 2018, TraceSecurity released a new anti-phishing product called PhinPoint In December 2018, TraceSecurity was named 2018 Cybersecurity Provider of the Year by US Business News.

== Operations ==
TraceSecurity is headquartered in Baton Rouge, Louisiana and has executive offices in Los Gatos, California. In 2018, the company employed approximately 85 people and served over 2,500 customers in fields spanning from financial services, health care, government and other regulated sectors. TraceSecurity's core market consists of organizations with assets in the range of $100 million to $1 billion.

TraceSecurity launched a channel partner program in 2013 to help value added resellers (VARs), managed security service providers (MSSPs), and consultants build their security and IT governance, risk and compliance services aimed at small and midsized businesses. The partner program has five partner levels to support various levels of participation and benefits: referral partner, reseller partner, value-added reseller, consulting partner and technology partner. TraceSecurity had partners across the United States in 2013.
