= Little Snitch =

Host-based application firewall

- The logo for Little Snitch 4
- Developer: Objective Development Software GmbH
- Stable release: 6.3.3 (November 19, 2025; 7 months ago) [±]
- Written in: Objective-C
- Operating system: macOS, Linux
- Available in: German, English
- Type: Firewall
- License: Proprietary (macOS); mixed GPLv2 and proprietary components (for Linux)
- Website: obdev.at/products/littlesnitch (macOS); obdev.at/products/littlesnitch-linux/index.html (for Linux)
- Repository: github.com/obdev/littlesnitch-linux (for Linux)

Little Snitch and Little Snitch for Linux are a multi-platform pair of host-based application firewalls supported by Objective Development Software GmbH for macOS and Linux-based desktop computer systems, respectively. Each can be used to monitor applications, preventing or permitting them to connect to attached networks through advanced rules.

Unlike a stateful firewall, which is designed primarily to protect a system from external attacks by restricting inbound traffic, Little Snitch is designed to protect privacy by limiting outbound traffic. Until Little Snitch 4, it controlled network traffic by registering kernel extensions through the standard application programming interface (API) provided by Apple, but at version 5 it switched to using Apple's Network Extensions due to the deprecation of kernel extensions on macOS Catalina.

When an application or process attempts to establish a network connection, Little Snitch presents a dialog that allows the user to deny or permit the connection once, for a limited time, or permanently. The dialog also allows the user to restrict the parameters of the connection, for example allowing a given application to only connect to a certain domain or using a specific protocol or port. Little Snitch's integral network monitor shows ongoing traffic in real time with domain names and traffic direction.

The application (version 4) received a positive 4.5/5 review from Macworld.

In 2026 a Linux version was released. While the macOS version is written in Objective-C, the Linux version is written in Rust.
