= Jon Stickley Trio =

American bluegrass trio

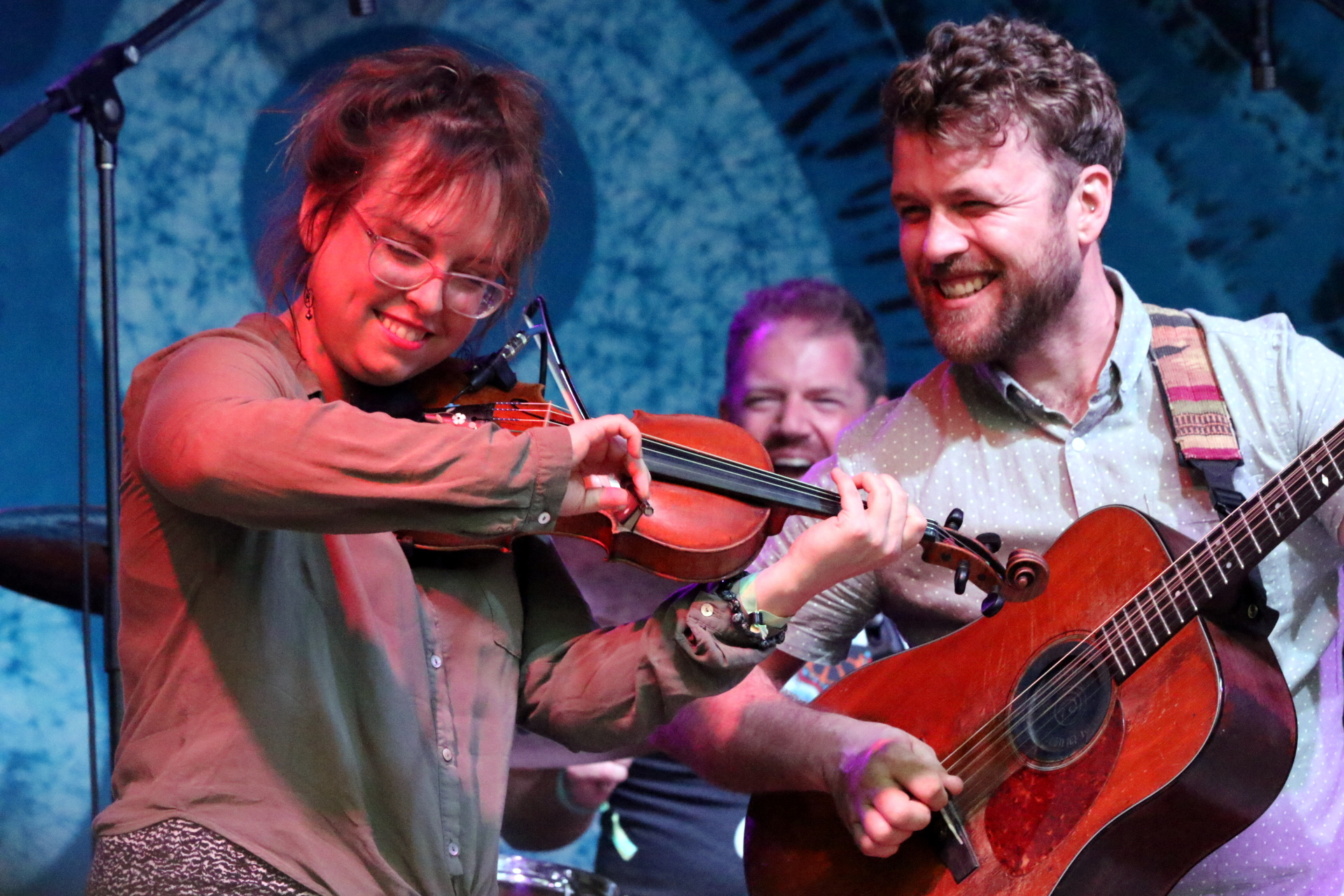
- Lyndsay Pruett, Patrick Armitage, and Jon Stickley, at Suwannee Springfest in 2016

Background information
- Genres: Bluegrass
- Members: Jon Stickley, guitar Lyndsay Pruett, violin Hunter Deacon, drums
- Past members: Patrick Armitage, drums
- Website: jonstickley.com

The Jon Stickley Trio is a progressive ensemble from Asheville, North Carolina. They are rooted in the traditions of bluegrass, but perform Gypsy jazz and folk-punk as well. Jon Stickley plays flat-pick guitar; Lyndsay Pruett plays violin; Hunter Deacon plays drums.
