= John D. Batten =

British artist (1860–1932)

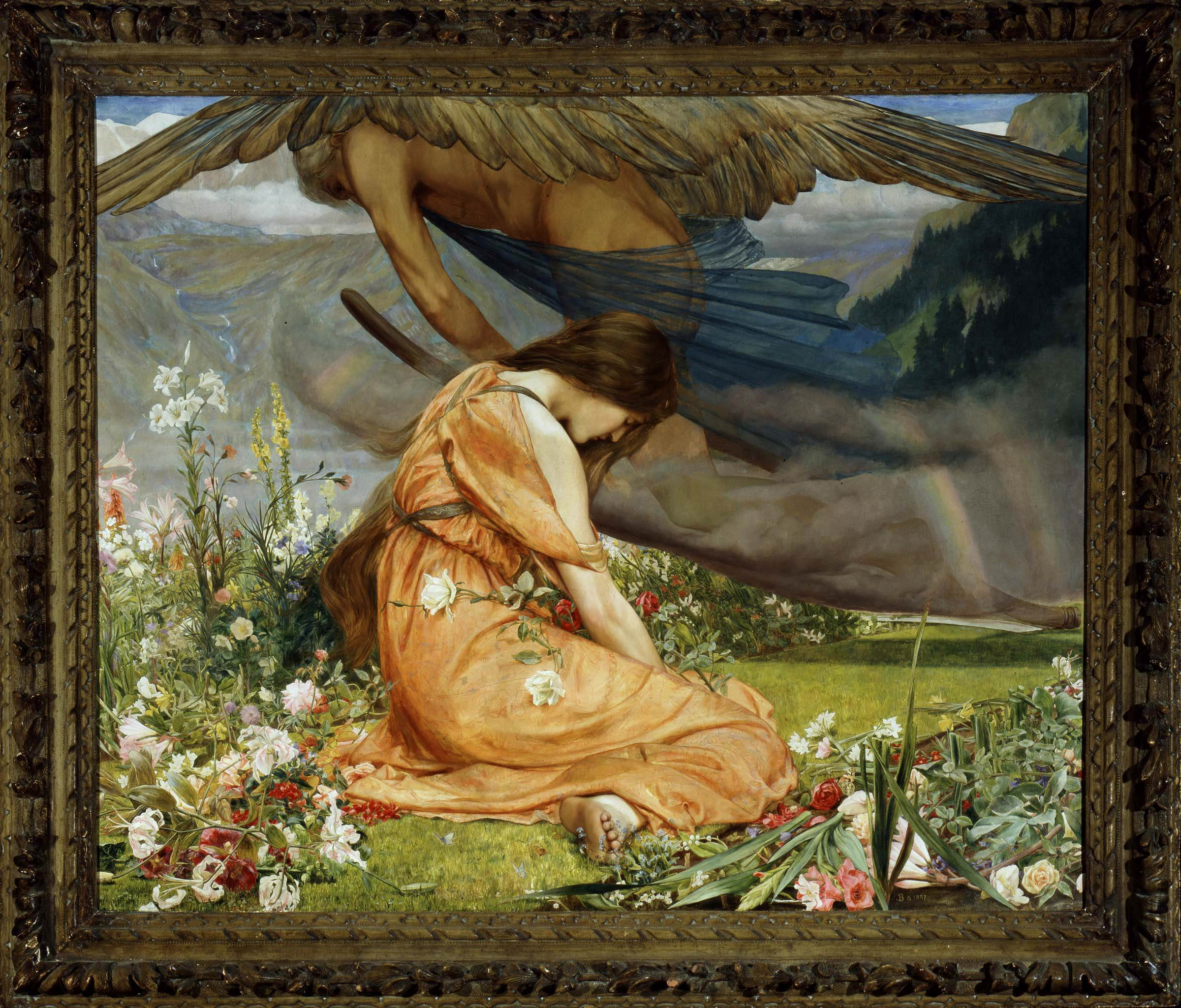
The Garden of Adonis—Amoretta and Time (1887), illustrating The Faerie Queene

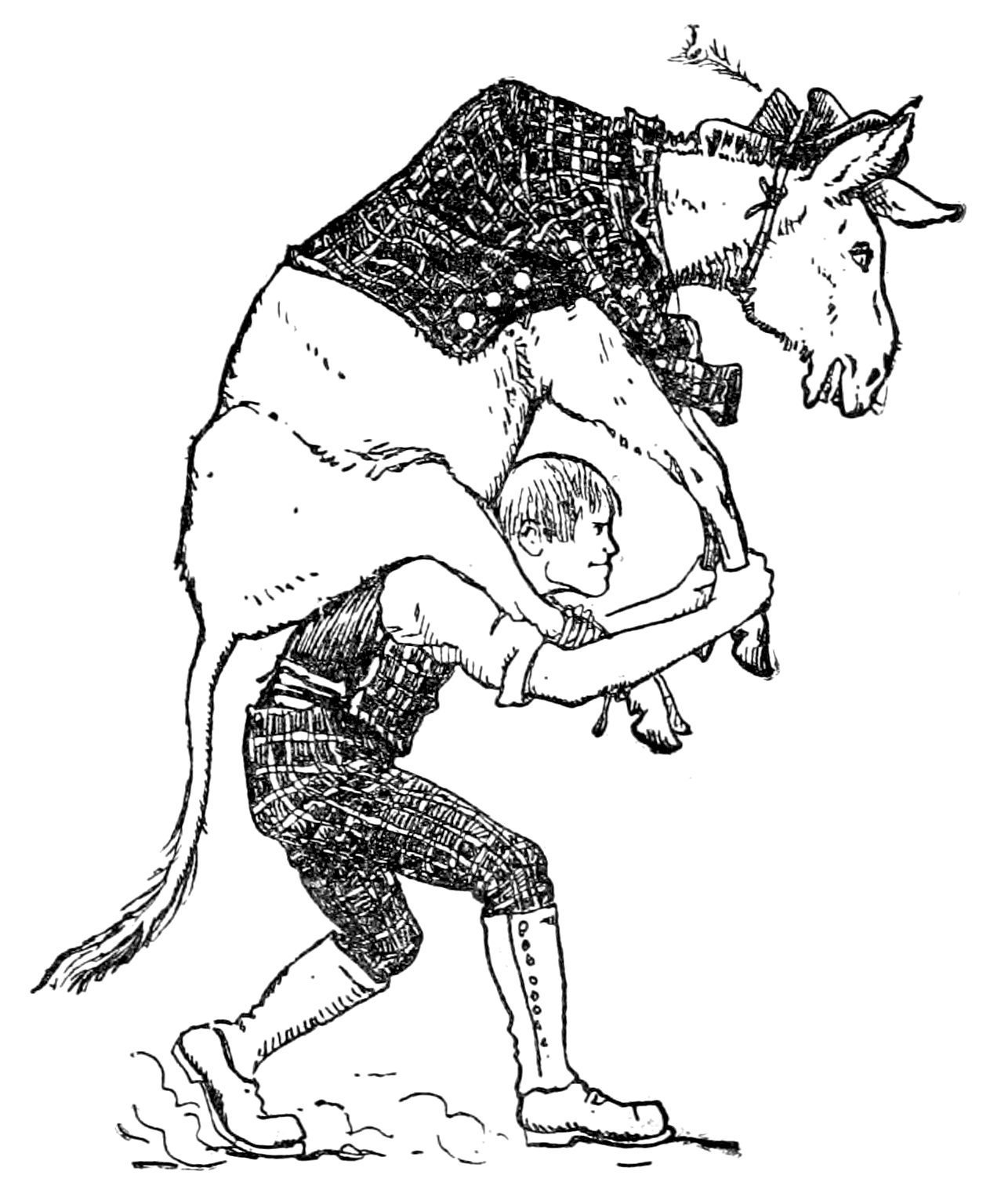
One of Batten's illustrations for English Fairy Tales, 1890

John Dickson Batten (8 October 1860 – 5 August 1932), born in Plymouth, Devon, was an English painter of figures in oils, tempera and fresco and a book illustrator and printmaker. He was an active member of the Society of Painters in Tempera, with his wife Mary Batten, a gilder.

Though some of his large paintings were successful, he spent much of his time on illustrations and small works on paper.

== Career ==
He was the third son of the barrister John Winterbotham Batten. He was educated at Amersham Hall, and matriculated at Trinity College, Cambridge in 1879, graduating B.A. in 1883, LL.B. 1884, and M.A. 1886. Meanwhile he had been admitted to the Inner Temple in 1881, and was called to the bar in 1884.

Batten then became a student at the Slade School of Fine Arts under Alphonse Legros. He exhibited until 1887 at the Grosvenor Gallery with Sir Edward Burne-Jones.

== Works ==
Batten specialized in mythological and allegorical themes. Among Batten's large paintings are The Garden of Adonis: Amoretta and Time, The Family, Mother and Child, Sleeping Beauty: The Princess Pricks Her Finger, Snow White and the Seven Dwarves, and Atalanta and Melanion.

In the 1890s Batten illustrated a series of fairy tale collections edited by Joseph Jacobs, who was a member of the Folklore Society (and editor of its journal 1890–93): at least English Fairy Tales, Celtic Fairy Tales, Indian Fairy Tales, More English Fairy Tales, and More Celtic Fairy Tales from 1890 to 1895 and Europa's Fairy Book (1916). (The latter has also been issued as European Folk and Fairy Tales.) He also illustrated English versions of Tales from the Arabian Nights and Dante's Inferno.

Batten also wrote two books of poetry and a book on animal and human flight.

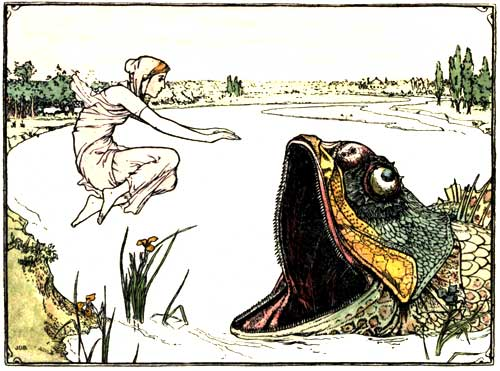
Indian Fairy Tales, Edited by Joseph Jacobs, Illustrated by John D. Batten

At the end of the 1890s he turned to the painting technique of egg tempera and played an important part in its revival with Birmingham artists such as Arthur Gaskin. His Pandora in this medium was exhibited at the Royal Academy in 1913 and presented to Reading University in 1918, where it has now been restored. Batten also served as a Secretary to the Society of Painters in Tempera and published in 1922 an article on The Practice of Tempera Painting. There is an article & bibliography in Studies 86 of the Imaginative Book Illustration Society https://bookillustration.org

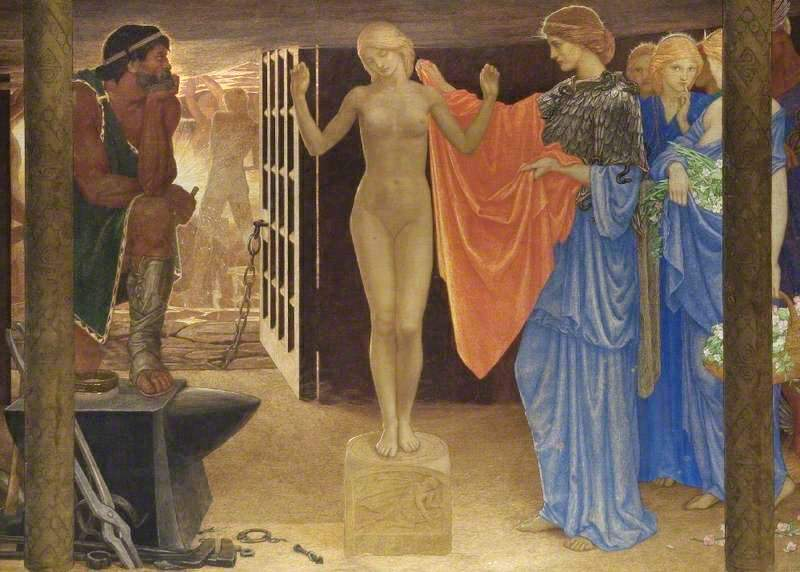
Pandora 1913

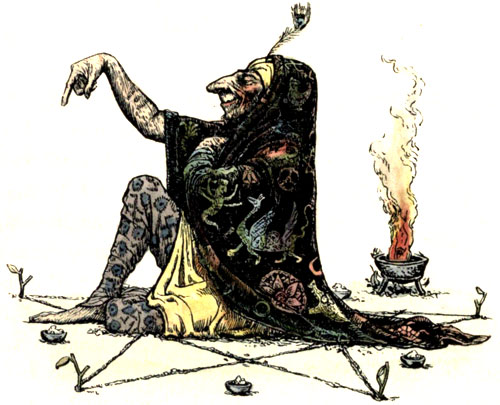
Indian Fairy Tales, Edited by Joseph Jacobs, Illustrated by John D. Batten

== Gallery ==
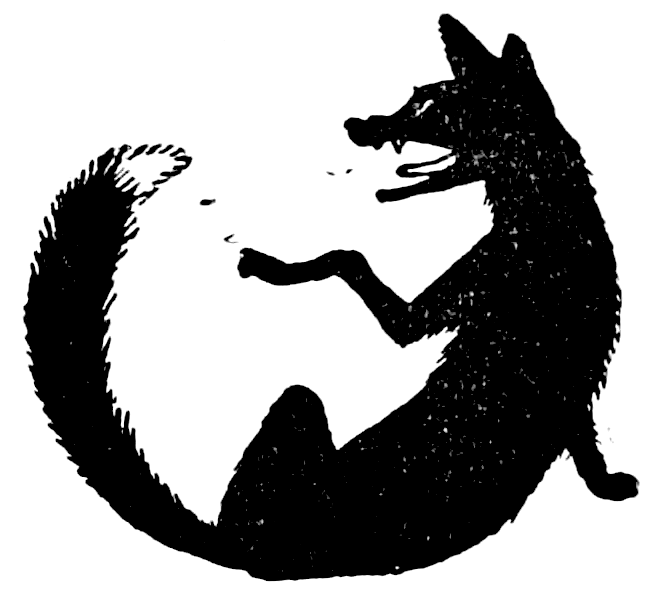
Illustration of Europa's Fairy Book, 1916

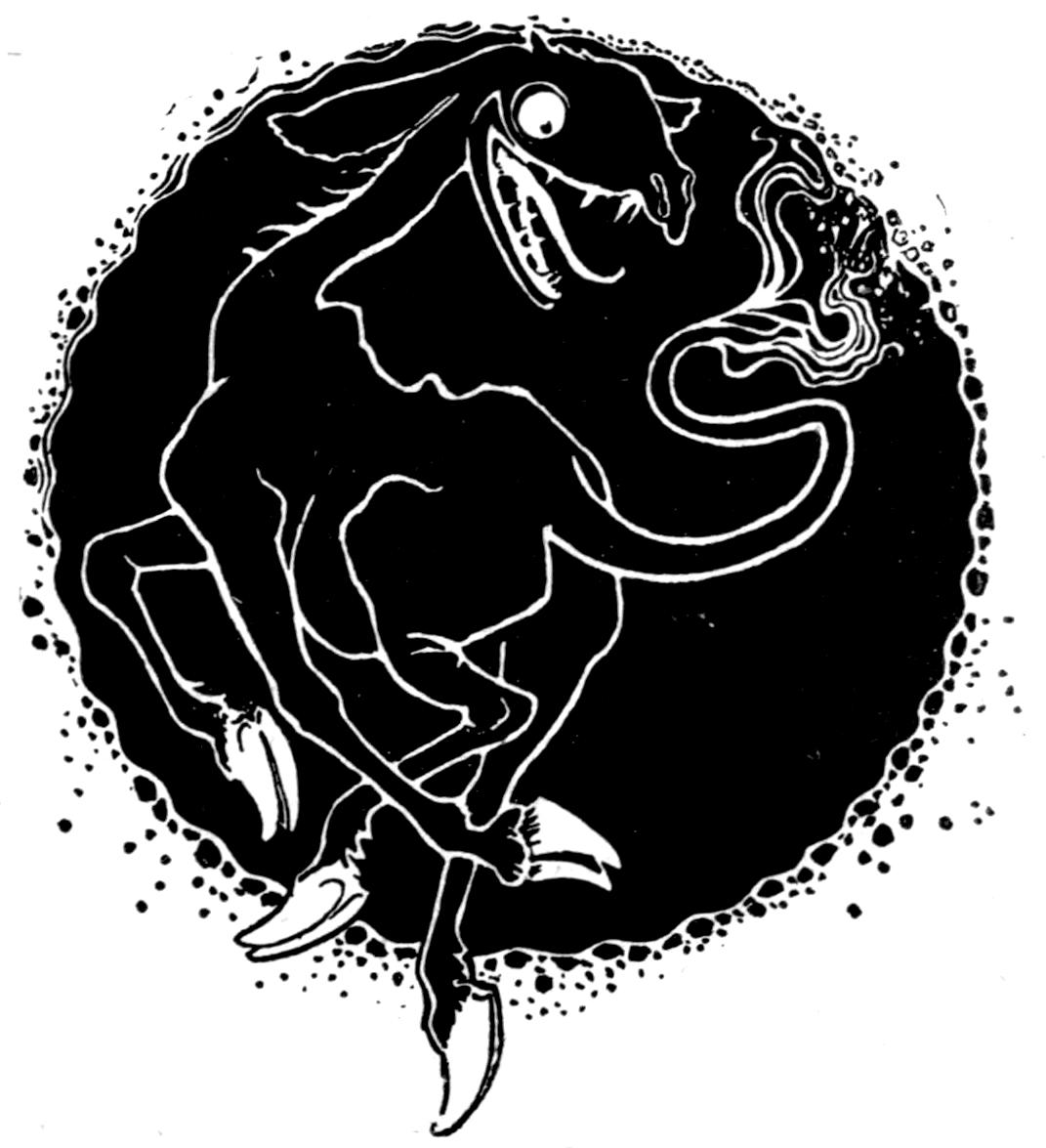
Design in front matter of More English Fairy Tales, 1894.

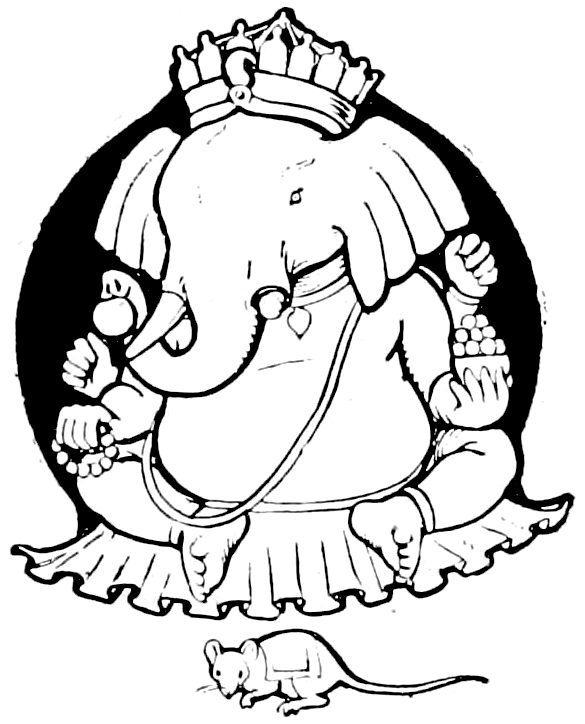
Design in front matter of Indian Fairy Tales, 1892.

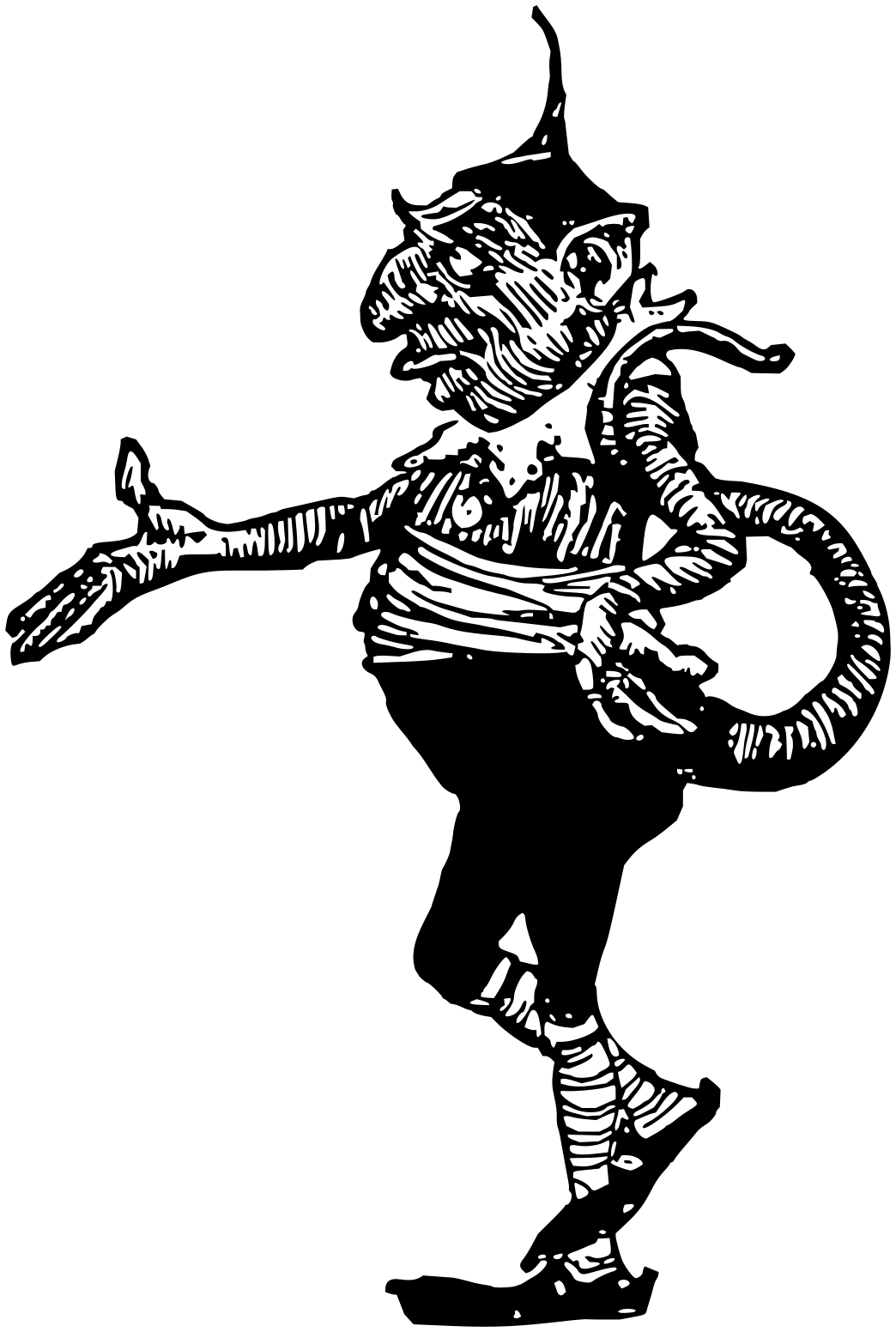
Illustration by Batten for English Fairy Tales, 1892 : How to get into my book

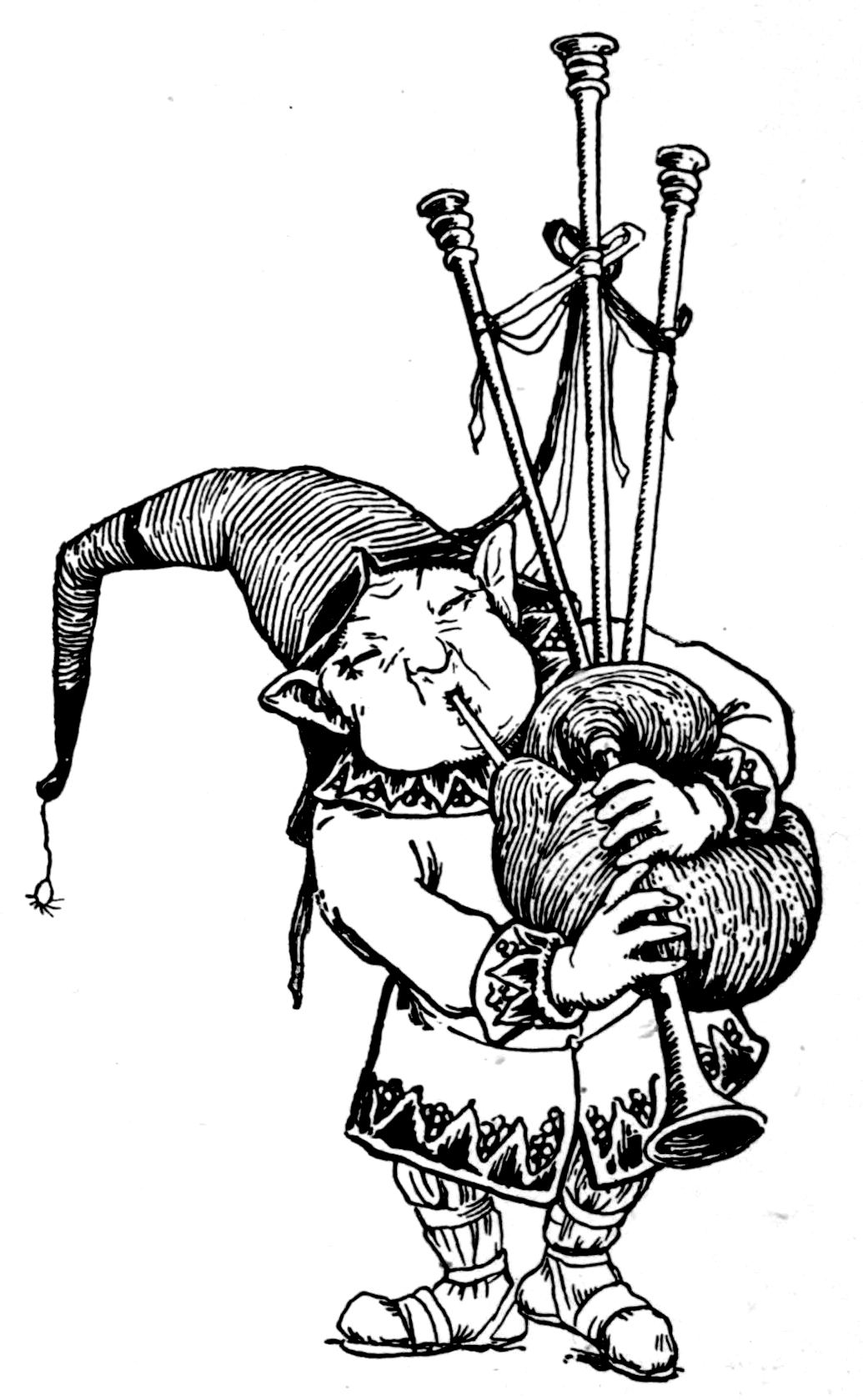
Design in front matter of More Celtic Fairy Tales, 1895.

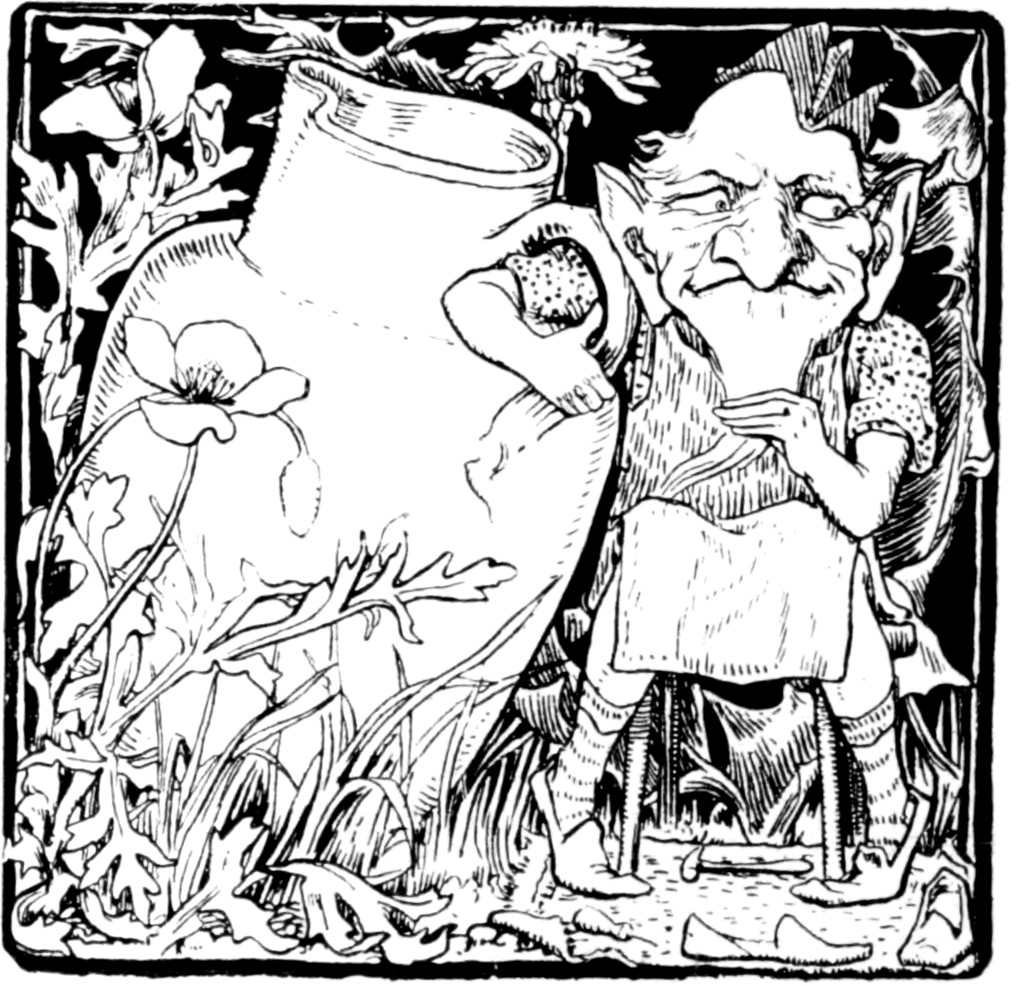
Illustration for an Irish legend in Celtic Fairy Tales, 1892.

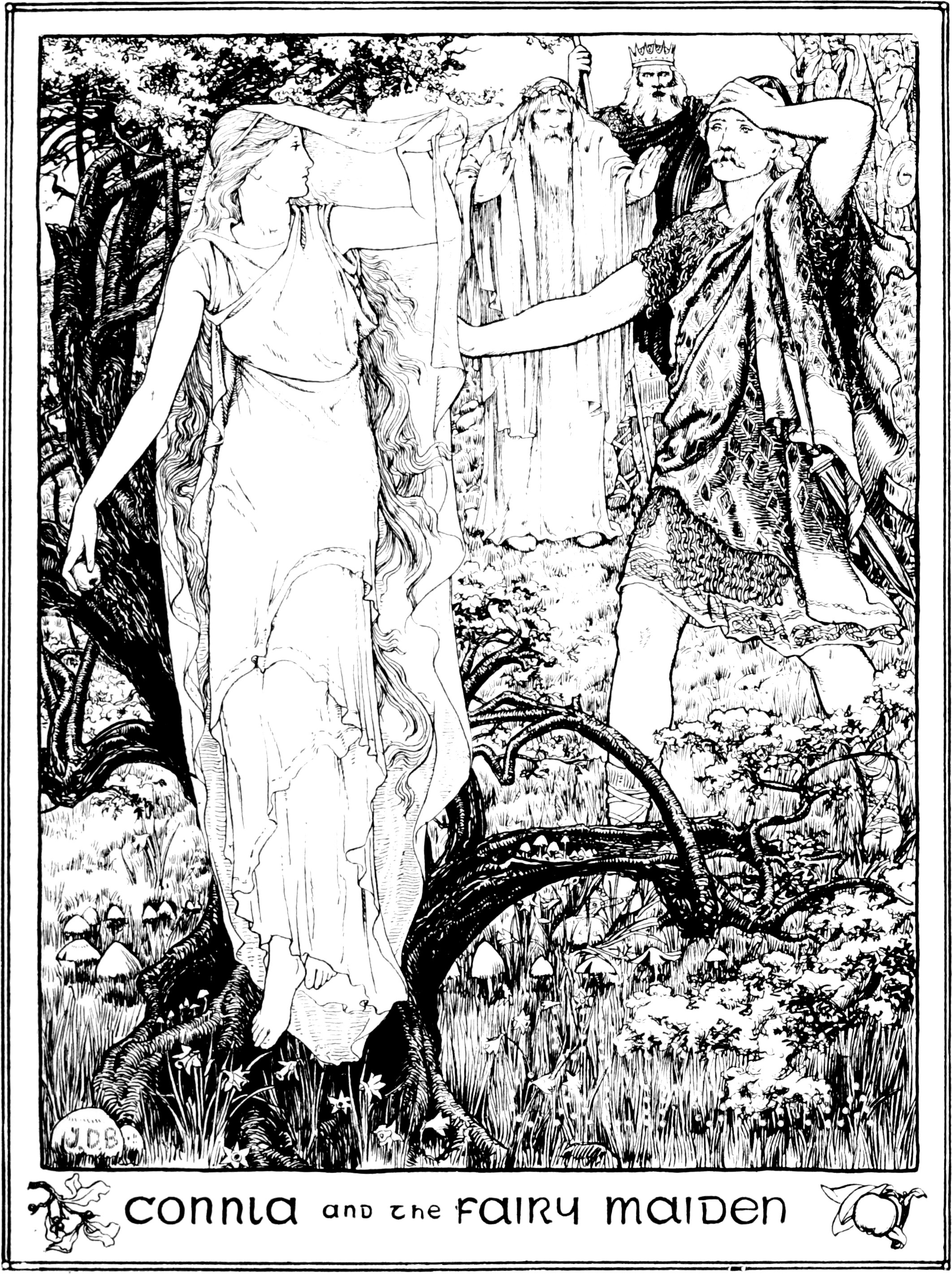
Connla and the Fairy Maiden (from Celtic Fairy Tales, by Joseph Jacobs) 1892

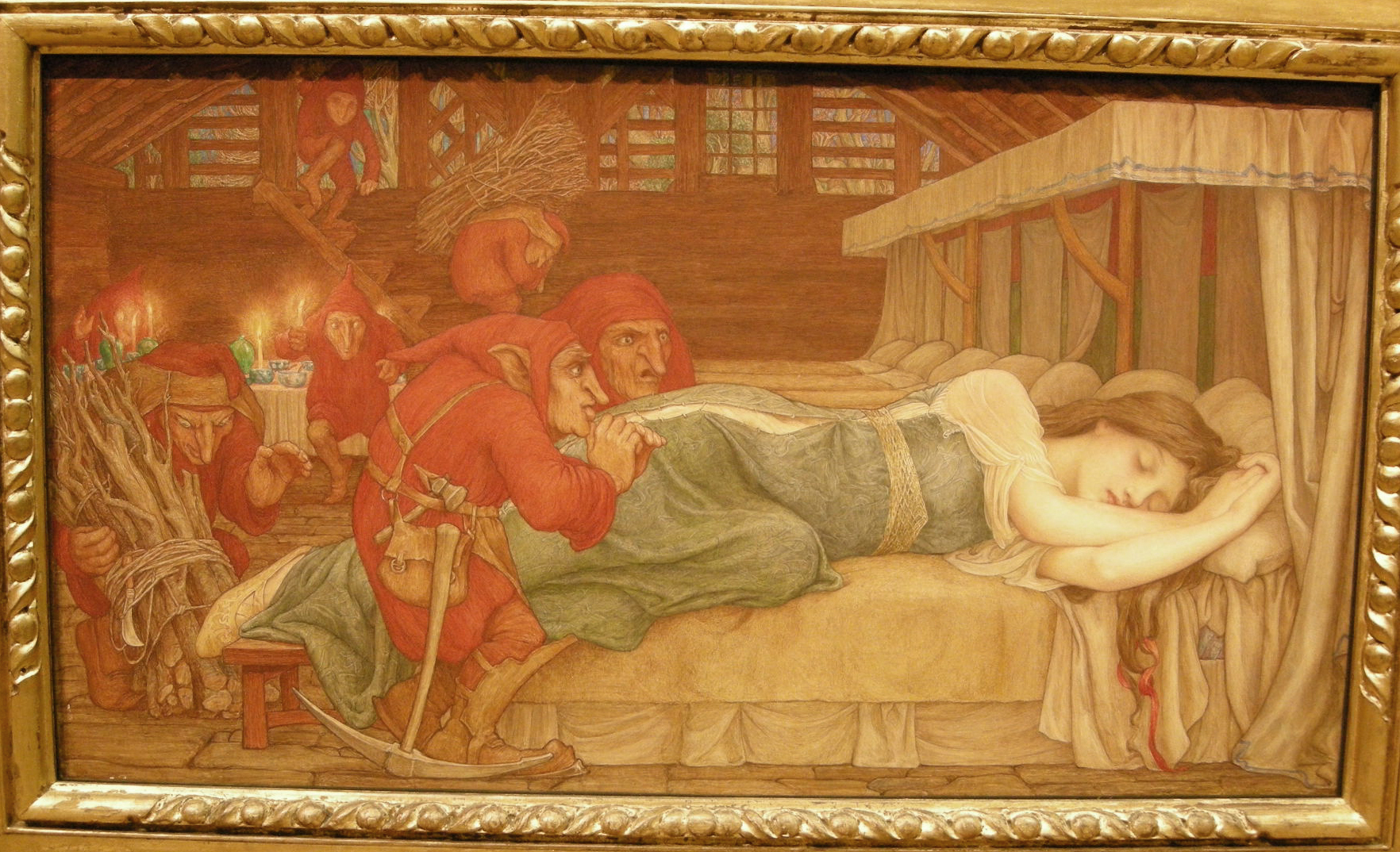
Biancaneve e i sette nani (Snow White and the Seven Dwarves) 1897

== Sources ==
- Alan Windsor. (1998) Handbook of Modern British Painting and Printmaking, 1900–1990. Ashgate Publishing, 2nd ed. ISBN 1-85928-427-2 ISBN 978-1859284278.
