= Jon Stickley =

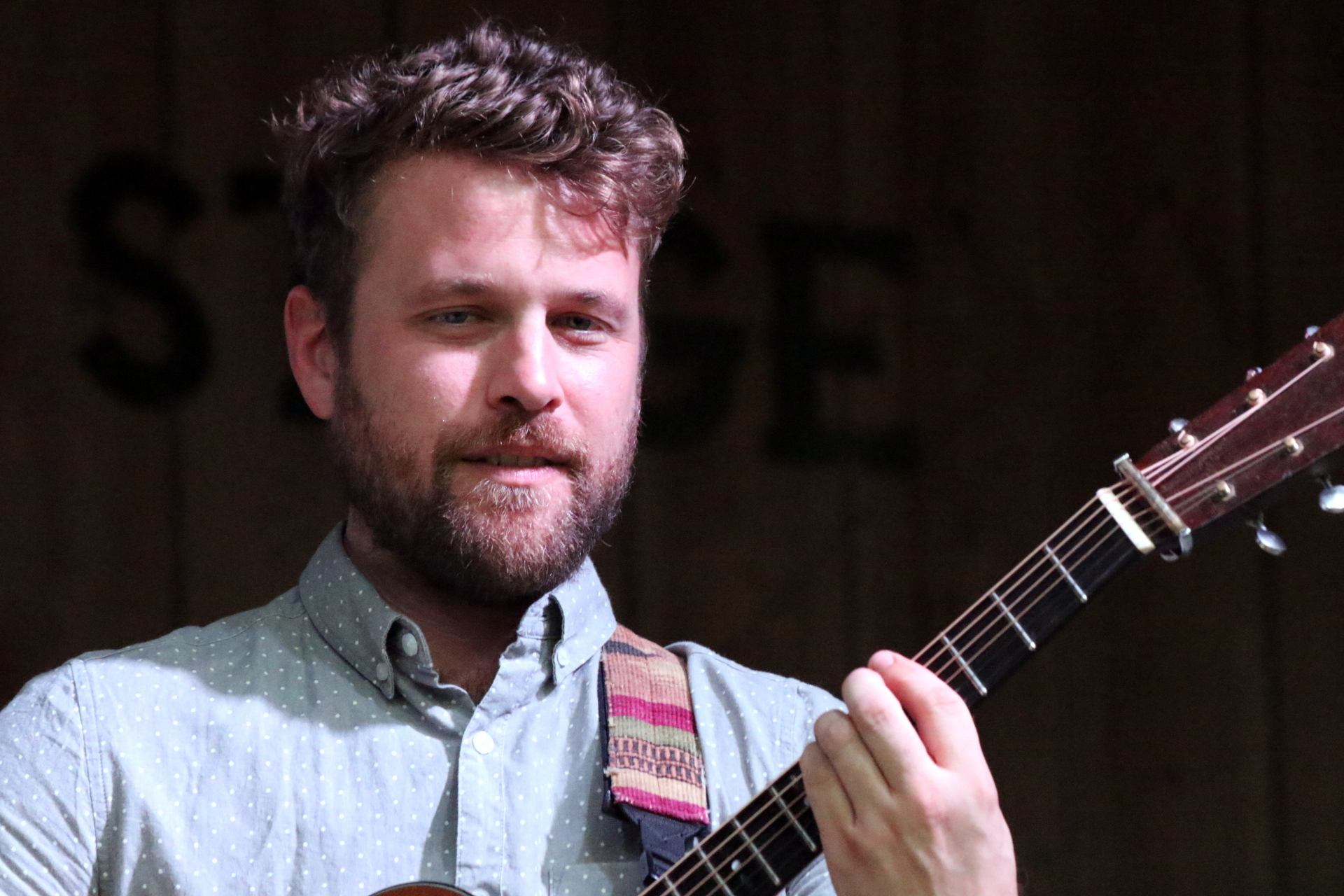
- Jon Stickley at Suwannee Springfest, 2016

Background information
- Born: Durham, NC, United States
- Occupation: Musician
- Instrument: Guitar
- Member of: Jon Stickley Trio
- Website: jonstickley.com

Jon Stickley is an American guitarist. He is the leader of the Jon Stickley Trio.
