= Anne K. Batten =

American politician from Vermont (born 1932)

Member of the Vermont House of Representatives from the Hardwick, Vermont district
- In office 1981–1988

Personal details
- Born: 1932 (age 93–94) Long Island, New York
- Occupation: Politician and Commissioner of the Vermont Commission on Women

Anne K. Batten (born 1932) is a Vermont politician who was a member of the legislature of Vermont from 1981 to 1988. She also served on the Commission on Women in the State of Vermont in the 1980s. She was a representative of the Hardwick, Vermont area.

== Early life and education ==
Batten was born on July 24, 1932, in Long Island, New York. She attended Turners Falls High School in Turners Falls, Massachusetts.

== Career ==
Batten was instrumental in proposing legislation that would require the Vermont House to write all its legislation in gender-neutral terms. Batten's belief is that language shapes people and that what you see on a page is sublimely absorbed, and she wants future generations of women, young women, to lead legislation and not see male pronouns throughout all the legislation. The legislation passed the House and Senate, and the drafting of bills began to be written in gender-neutral terms.

During her tenure in the Vermont House Legislature, Batten voted for bills related to Act 250, Vermont's developmental and control law, established in 1970, that provides a public, quasi-judicial process for reviewing and managing the environmental, social and fiscal consequences of major subdivisions and development in Vermont through the issuance of land use permits. Batten also sponsored a bill for a merger of the town and village of Hardwick. She also sponsored a bill for the protection of the elderly and disabled adults from abuse.
