= John Winterbotham Batten =

John Winterbotham Batten QC (1831–1901) was an English barrister much involved in railway companies. He was noted in 1883 as holding 16 directorships.

== Life ==
He was born in Devonport, the second son of John Batten and his wife Mary Brend Winterbotham, daughter of William Winterbotham; the solicitor James Brend Batten (1830–1897) was his elder brother, and the physician Rayner Winterbotham Batten (1835–1909) a younger brother. He attended Mill Hill Grammar School from 1845 to 1847, and in early life was a naval outfitter.

Batten was articled to the solicitor Lindsey Winterbotham the younger of Stroud, his first cousin. He was the brother of Henry Winterbotham MP; and as sons of Lindsey Winterbotham the elder, banker at Stroud, they were grandsons of William Winterbotham. He entered the Inner Temple in 1869, aged 38, and was called to the bar in 1872. As a barrister, Batten went the Western Circuit. He lived in London at 15 Airlie Gardens, Kensington; and had chambers at 3 Harcourt Buildings, Temple. He was appointed Queen's Counsel in 1889.

In 1900 Batten was listed as a director of 10 railway companies and two land companies. He was chairman of the Buenos Aires Great Southern Railway and the Plymouth and Dartmoor Railway.

== Death ==
John Winterbotham Batten died on 2 June 1901. The estate left in his will was valued at £73,646.

== Family ==
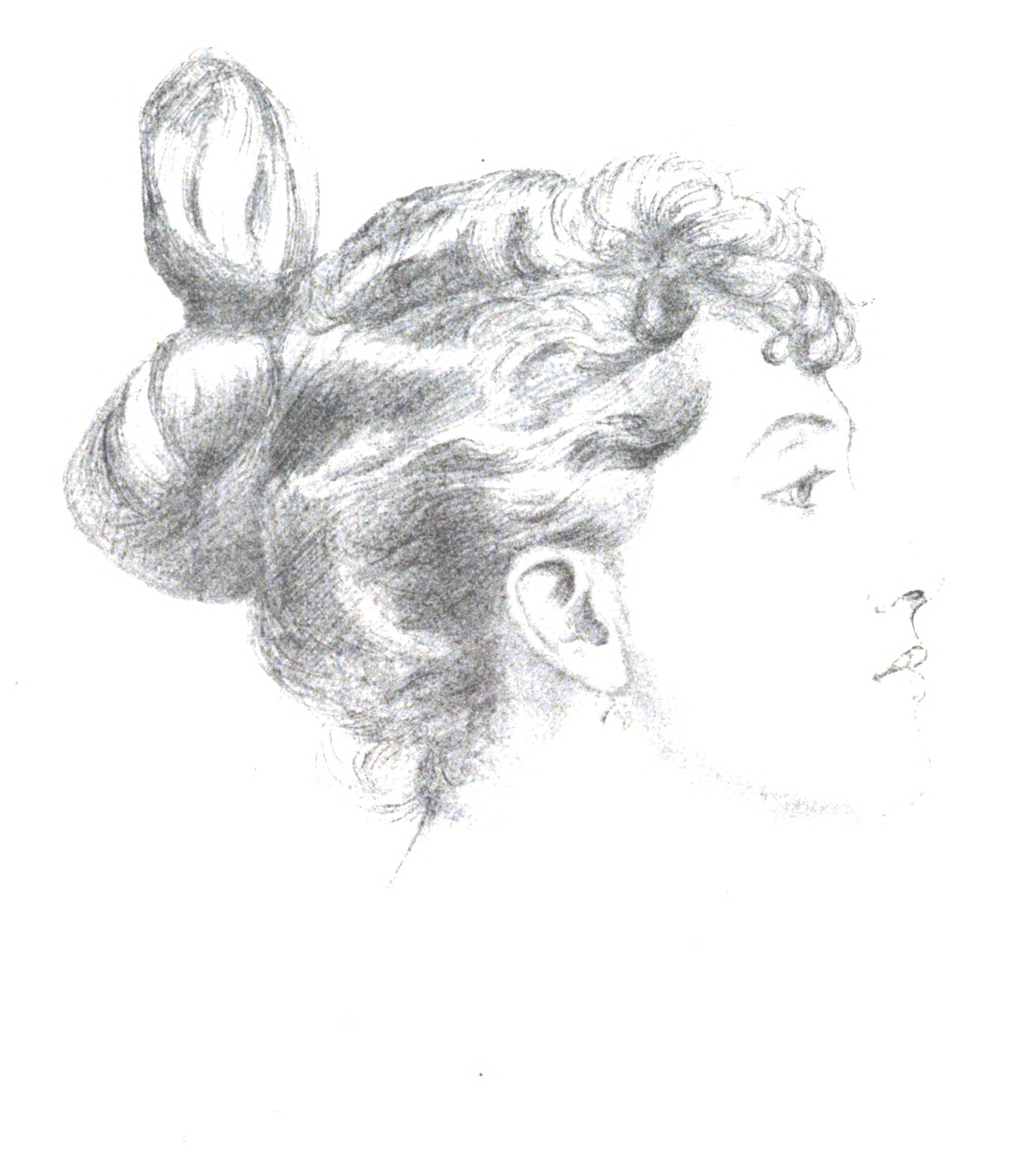
Sarah Langstaff Derry Batten, portrait by Violet Manners

Batten married in 1854 Sarah Langstaff Derry, daughter of Samuel Derry MD of Plymouth. Their children included four sons, one dying young:

- Lindsey Forster Batten, eldest son, died 1865 aged 9.
- Rayner Derry Batten (born 1858), ophthalmologist, married, firstly, Marion Leonard (died 1870 aged 32); married 1888 Katharine Roubiliac Conder, daughter of Eustace Rogers Conder DD. The physician Lindsey Willett Batten was a son of the second marriage.
- John Dickson Batten (1860–1932), illustrator, married in 1903 the artist Mary Emmeline Bott..
- Frederick Batten (1865–1918), youngest son, neurologist.

Of the daughters:

- Catharine Mary Batten, eldest daughter, married in 1883 the Irish Presbyterian minister and academic William Todd Martin (1837–1915).
- Beatrice Brend Batten, second daughter, married in 1887 the surgeon Henry Brewer Tait. She was the mother of Greville Brend Tait (1882–1963), a general practitioner, and grandmother of Ian Tait.
