= Jim Stickley =

- Born: California, United States
- Occupations: Cyber security expert, writer, public speaker
- Known for: Cyber security expert and founder of TraceSecurity
- Title: CEO

James Stickley is an American cyber security expert, writer, and public speaker who is the CEO of cyber security education company Stickley on Security and a co-founder and board member of TraceSecurity, Inc..

He is known for his unique research into security vulnerabilities that affect organizations as well as exposing identity theft risks to the average person. Since 2015 he has also been the featured cyber security expert in Lifelock infomercials.

== Early years ==
In May 2000, Stickley discovered a buffer overflow vulnerability in the Gauntlet Firewall manufactured by Network Associates (known today as McAfee). This vulnerability allowed an attacker to remotely execute arbitrary code which resulted in complete compromise of the firewall. Before this discovery, application firewalls had been considered by many security experts to be the most secure solution for protecting networks on the Internet, and Network Associates had claimed Gauntlet Firewall to be the "Worlds most secure firewall". In September 2001, Stickley discovered an additional buffer overflow vulnerability in the same Gauntlet product.

== Discoveries and demonstrations ==
In 2012 Stickley created a device that was hidden inside a magic marker that allowed him to bypass the locks on hotel rooms throughout the United States. In 2015 Stickley released a video showing the weaknesses in hotel safes after discovering he could bypass the digital locks. In 2017 Stickley discovered a vulnerability in Nordstrom Gift Cards that allowed him to use any Nordstrom Gift Card that was currently active.

== Television ==
Stickley has appeared as an expert on several networks, including CNN, Fox News Channel, NBC, and CNBC.

As of 2017, Stickley was appearing as the "Cyber Security Expert" for LifeLock Inc. (NYSE:LOCK) in their televised and online infomercials.

== Books ==
- The Truth About Identity Theft (2008) Que Publishing
- Beautiful Security – Contributing Author (2009) O'Reilly
- Corporate Insecurity Que Publishing
