= Richard Lindsey Batten =

English orthopaedic surgeon (1920–1997)

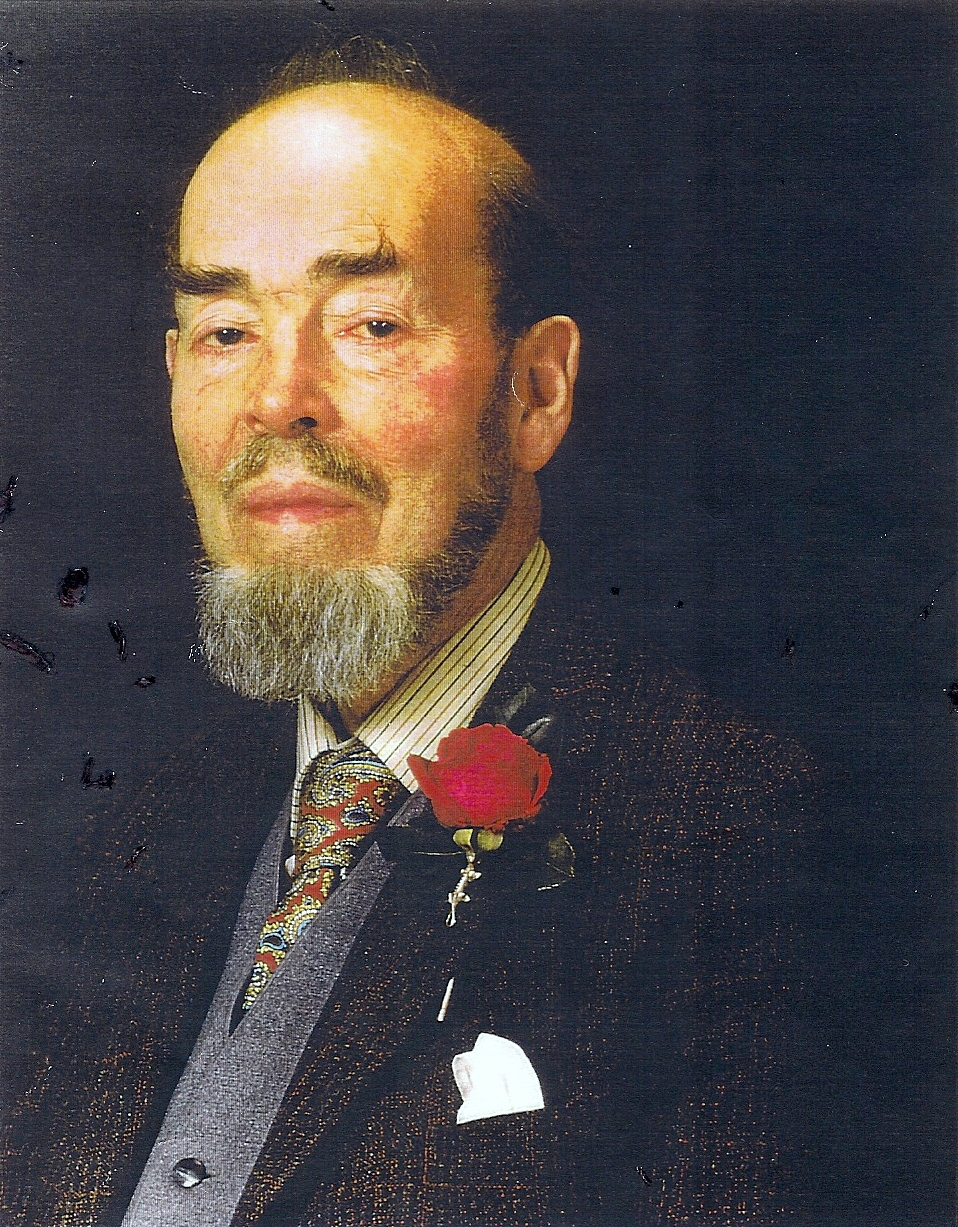
Richard Batten

Richard Lindsey Batten FRCS (29 September 1920 – 29 December 1997) was an English orthopaedic surgeon. He established the first blood bank in Nigeria, and introduced in Britain the AO technique for internal fixation of fractures. He taught orthopaedics at the Birmingham General Hospital, and was the first editor of the scientific trauma journal Injury.

== Early life ==
Richard was born 29 September 1920 in London, the son of Ellen Mary (Molly) Batten (née Turnbull) and Lindsey Willett Batten, a family practitioner and Fellow of the Royal College of Physicians. Richard attended Westminster School, singing in the choir at the coronation of King George VI. He then studied medicine at Trinity College, Cambridge and at the Westminster Hospital in London.

== Army WWII medical career ==
Entering the British army in 1944 as a medical officer, his three-week training included learning to ride a motor bicycle. He served in Italy and Yugoslavia. He wrote that "I was not courageous enough to be a conscientious objector, although my feelings were in that direction." Later he became a British forces medical officer in Venice: he bought a traditional sandolo boat to row himself to visit the sick, keeping the boat on the Grand Canal in front of Venice's Europa Hotel where he was billeted. His work included medical support for the many Italian pregnant brides of British soldiers.

== Hereford Hospital ==
In the late 1940s he worked at Hereford hospital. He fell off his motor bike, concussed himself (crash helmets were little used then), and lost his sense of taste and smell. As an orthopaedic surgeon, he operated on many motor-bike riders after accidents and so campaigned vigorously for the use of crash helmets. He wrote to the then young Prince Philip, Duke of Edinburgh, recounting his accident and hospital experience, suggesting Prince Philip promote the use of crash helmets – Prince Philip soon advocated them at a suitable function, and helmets were in wide use in Britain in two years.

== Nigeria ==
In 1955, he established the trauma and orthopaedic service while working at the new University College Hospital in Ibadan, Nigeria. He there pioneered the use of Kuschner nails to fix femoral shaft fractures, and established Nigeria’s first blood bank. His older two children were born in Nigeria.

== Swiss AO technique ==
Richard returned to Britain in 1961 to be a Consultant Orthopaedic and Trauma surgeon at the West Bromwich Hospital. In 1965 he took sabbatical leave to work in Chur, Switzerland with Professor Martin Allgöwer who in the early 1960s had pioneered a new internal fixation technique for fractures. Richard introduced to Britain this AO technique developed by the AO Foundation (the Arbeitsgemeinschaft für Osteosynthesefragen). Convinced that this technique was a major advance in fracture management, he spread the technique throughout the UK via his orthopaedic registrars.

== Birmingham General Hospital ==
From 1967 to 1983, he was a consultant orthopaedic and trauma surgeon and lecturer at Birmingham General Hospital. Earlier than most surgeons, he assisted his trainees in many operations – they emerged particularly competent in AO fixation and Wagner leg lengthening techniques. In the early 1970s he sent his trainees to learn the new Charnley total hip replacement technique. Many of his trainees attended his retirement party when he was presented with a mounted Charnley hip replacement.

== First editor of Injury journal ==
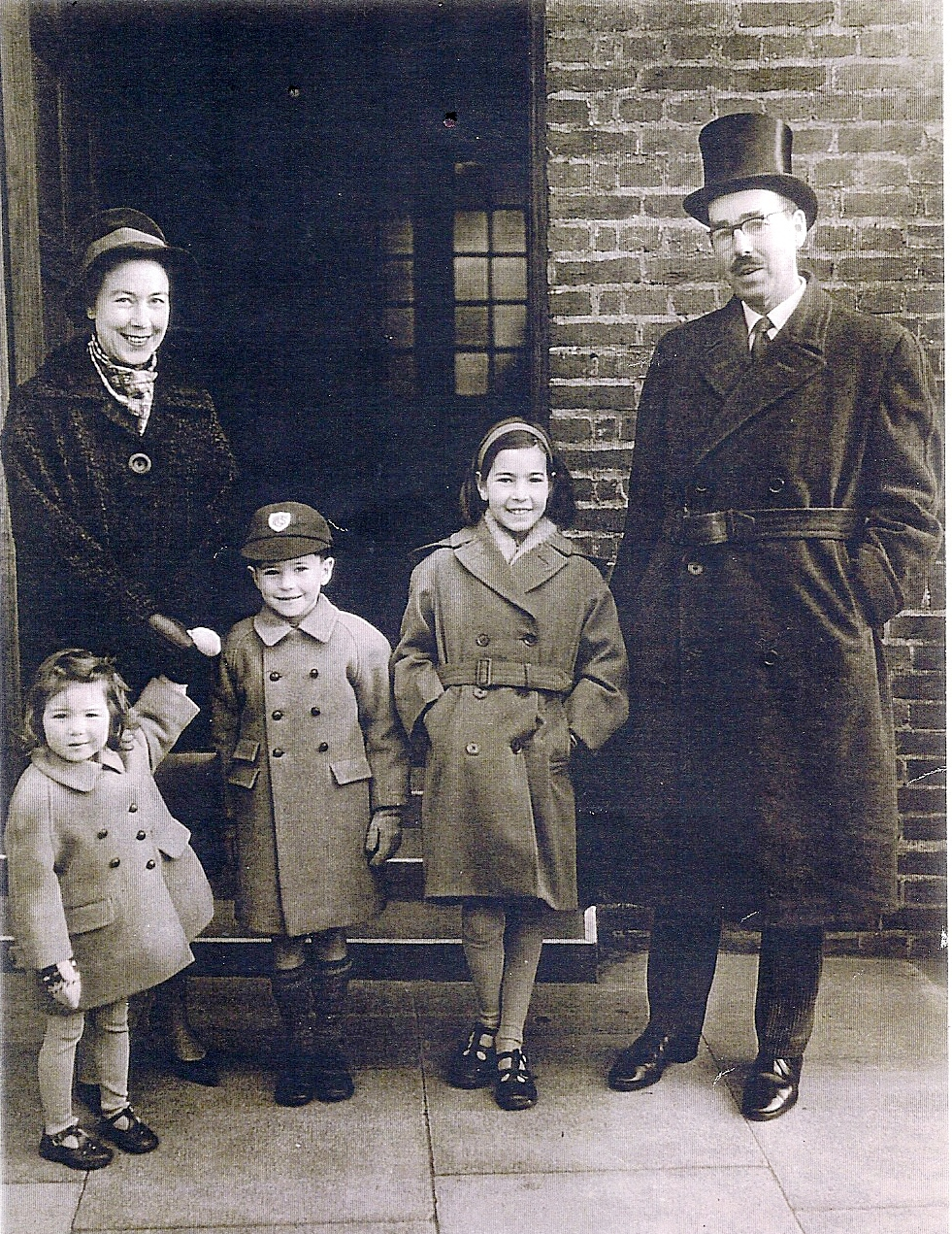
Richard and Mary Batten with their children at a wedding in 1966

In 1969, he became the first editor of the journal Injury which introduced academic rigour to the management of traumatic injuries. He was editor until 1983 for some 58 editions.

The full journal title was originally Injury: The British Journal of Accident Surgery — later, as it had stronger international influence, it was changed to Injury: International Journal of the care of the Injured.

== Married life, retirement, muscular dystrophy ==
He married Mary Longford in Hampstead, London on 18 December 1954, eventually retiring to Crockham Hill, near Edenbridge, Kent. They had three children Susan, Lindsey and Belinda.

For some 30 years Richard suffered from Myotonia Dystrophica. He died on 29 December 1997: his funeral was on 9 January 1998 in Tunbridge Wells.
