= Battenberg =

Battenberg or Battenburg may refer to:

== Places ==
- Battenberg (Eder), town in Hesse, origin of the house of Battenberg/Mountbatten
- Battenberg, Rhineland-Palatinate, a town in Rhineland-Palatinate, Germany
- Battenberg Hill, in the South Shetland Islands, Antarctica

== People ==
- Battenberg family, German noble family from Hesse
  - Julia, Princess of Battenberg (1825–1895)
  - Princess Marie of Battenberg (1852–1923)
  - Prince Louis of Battenberg (1854–1921)
  - Prince Alexander of Battenberg (1857–1893)
  - Prince Henry of Battenberg (1858–1896)
  - Prince Francis Joseph of Battenberg (1861–1924)
  - Princess Alice of Battenberg (1885–1969)
- John Nelson Battenberg (1931–2012), American sculptor

== Other uses ==
- Battenberg cake or Battenburg cake, a cake with a checkered pattern on the inside
- Battenburg markings, a pattern named after the aforementioned cake, often used on emergency services vehicles
- Battenberg Cup, an American naval award (named after Prince Louis of Battenberg)

== See also ==
- Mountbatten, UK branch of the German Battenberg family
- Mountbatten-Windsor, the personal surname of some of the descendants of Queen Elizabeth II and Prince Philip, Duke of Edinburgh
- Battenberg Castle, a castle ruin near Battenberg in the county of Bad Dürkheim in the state of Rhineland-Palatinate, Germany
- Battenberg Mausoleum, mausoleum of Prince Alexander of Battenberg in Sofia, Bulgaria
- Battenberg Palace, the popular name of the Rousse Regional Historical Museum building in Bulgaria
- Battenberg Chapel, in St Mildred's Church, Whippingham, on the Isle of Wight
- Battenberg Square, central square in Sofia, Bulgaria (named after Prince Alexander of Battenberg)
