= John Nelson Battenberg =

American sculptor (1931–2012)

'Gene and Giles',oil on canvas painting by John Battenberg, 2007

John Nelson Battenberg (December 3, 1931 – July 8, 2012) was an American sculptor.

Battenberg was born in Milwaukee, Wisconsin in 1931. An artist named John Goray first influenced him when Battenberg was about 10 years old. Battenberg did his undergraduate work in art at various Midwestern universities. He also attended the Ruskin School, Oxford University for two years. He received M.F.A.'s from Michigan State University and California School of Arts and Crafts.

Battenberg has resided in both Italy and England. He was a professor of sculpture at San José State University and now holds the title of professor emeritus. He left his professorship to pursue his sculpture full-time. In 2007, Battenberg returned to painting for a number of reasons, one of which was a leg injury which eventually prevented him from sculpting.

The Honolulu Museum of Art, the Krannert Art Museum (University of Illinois, Champaign, Illinois), the National Museum of Wildlife Art (Jackson Hole, Wyoming), the Oakland Museum of California (Oakland, California) the San Diego Museum of Art, the Seattle Art Museum (Seattle, Washington), the Syracuse University Art Collection (Syracuse, New York), the Triton Museum of Art (Santa Clara, California), and Phoenix University (Phoenix, Arizona) are among the public collections holding his work.

In 2009 John began using a technique utilizing a series of layers of painted images sandwiched between an equal number of 1/8” layers of optically clear plastic resin; creating a three dimensionality. Battenberg successfully moved his Koi to Arizona from California in 2006; some of his exotic Koi subjects are over 30 years old. Battenberg's Koi are the subjects of his 3D paintings.

John Battenberg lived his final years in Scottsdale, with his wife Lynn, two cats, an aviary of birds, and twenty-seven Koi fish contained in two outdoor ponds. He died on July 8, 2012, in Scottsdale.
