= Frederick Batten =

English neurologist and pediatrician

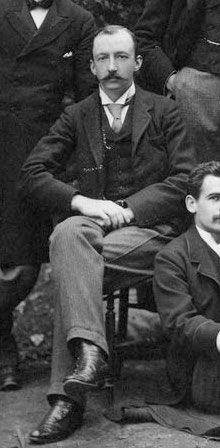
Frederick Batten in 1894

Frederick Eustace Batten (29 September 1865 – 27 July 1918) was an English neurologist and pediatrician who has been referred to as the "father of pediatric neurology".

== Biography ==
Frederick Batten was born on 29 September 1865 in Plymouth, the third son of the barrister John Winterbotham Batten and his wife Sarah Derry, daughter of the surgeon Samuel Deryy.. He attended Westminster School and Trinity College, Cambridge, and graduated in medicine in 1891 from St Bartholomew's Hospital Medical College in London. He worked as a pathologist at the Hospital for Sick Children and as a physician at the National Hospital. He obtained his doctorate in 1895, became a fellow of the Royal College of Physicians in 1901, and was elected dean in 1908. Batten disease was named after him after he first described it in 1903.

Batten died from infection after a routine prostatectomy.

== Eponym ==
- Batten disease
