= Web skimming =

Computer security attack against HTML forms

Web skimming, formjacking or a magecart attack is an attack in which the attacker injects malicious code into a website and extracts data from an HTML form that the user has filled in. That data is then submitted to a server under control of the attacker.

== Mitigation ==
Subresource Integrity or a Content Security Policy can be used to protect against formjacking, although this does not protect against supply chain attacks. A web application firewall can also be used.

== Prevalence ==
A report in 2016 suggested as many as 6,000 e-commerce sites may have been compromised via this class of attack. In 2018, the personal data of around 429,612 British Airways customers and staff may have been accessed via this class of attack. In 2020 the UK Information Commissioner's Office fined the airline £20 million over the breach. This was the largest fine it had issued up to that point. A similar attack affected Ticketmaster the same year, with 40,000 customers affected by maliciously injected code on payment pages. In November 2020 the UK Information Commissioner's Office fined Ticketmaster UK Limited £1.25 million over the breach after finding that it had failed to adequately secure a chatbot on its online payment page.

== Magecart ==
Magecart is software used by a range of hacking groups for injecting malicious code into ecommerce sites to steal payment details. As well as targeted attacks such as on Newegg, it's been used in combination with commodity Magento extension attacks. The 'Shopper Approved' ecommerce toolkit utilised on hundreds of ecommerce sites was also compromised by Magecart as was the conspiracy site InfoWars.

According to Malwarebytes, the Magecart software has tried to avoid detection by using the WebGL API to check whether a software renderer such as "swiftshader", "llvmpipe" or "virtualbox" is used. That would indicate that the software is running in a virtual machine probably used to detect the malware rather than make a purchase.

In October 2023 a Magecart version was reported to be inserted into all the 404 error pages of infected Web sites. The default "404 Not Found" page is used to hide and load the card-stealing code. The site visitor enters sensitive details into, for example, an order form, then sees a fake "session timeout" error, while the information is sent to the attacker.
