= Samanage =

Samanage, now part of SolarWinds, an enterprise service-desk and IT asset-management provider, had its headquarters in Cary, North Carolina. The company's flagship product, Samanage, operates as a multi-tenant, Software-as-a-Service (SaaS) system for IT and enterprise service management. As of November 2018, Samanage had more than 1,800 customers in 50+ countries.

== History ==
Founded in 2007 by Doron Gordon, Samanage first delivered IT asset management software in 2010 after a three-year development and testing period. This was followed by service desk functionality in 2011.

== Product ==
The ITIL-ready service desk includes a self-service portal, service catalog, knowledge base, and SLA management tool. The Samanage REST API allows for integration with hundreds of applications.

== Growth ==
In May 2015, Samanage raised $16 million in new funding. The series B funding was led by Marker LLC and Vintage Investment Partners, with participation from existing shareholders Carmel Ventures, Gemini Israel Ventures, and Silicon Valley Bank.

Samanage announced in February 2017 that it had received $20 million in new funding. The series C included investments from Carmel Ventures, Gemini Israel Ventures, Marker LLC, Salesforce Ventures, and Vintage Investment Partners.

As one of the most reviewed and highest rated platforms in the IT service management space, Samanage was named a top 100 Software Company of 2018 by G2 Crowd and recognized by its customers in the Gartner Peer Insights 2018 Customer Choice Awards for its IT Service Management Tool.

On November 8, 2018, Samanage secured $30 million in Series D funding led by Morgan Stanley Expansion Capital to accelerate development of their employee service management solutions to best enable customers to maximize the potential from their people.

On April 11, 2019, SolarWinds announced that it has signed an agreement to acquire Samanage for a reported purchase price of $350 million in cash.
