= British Airways data breach =

2018 breach of customer data

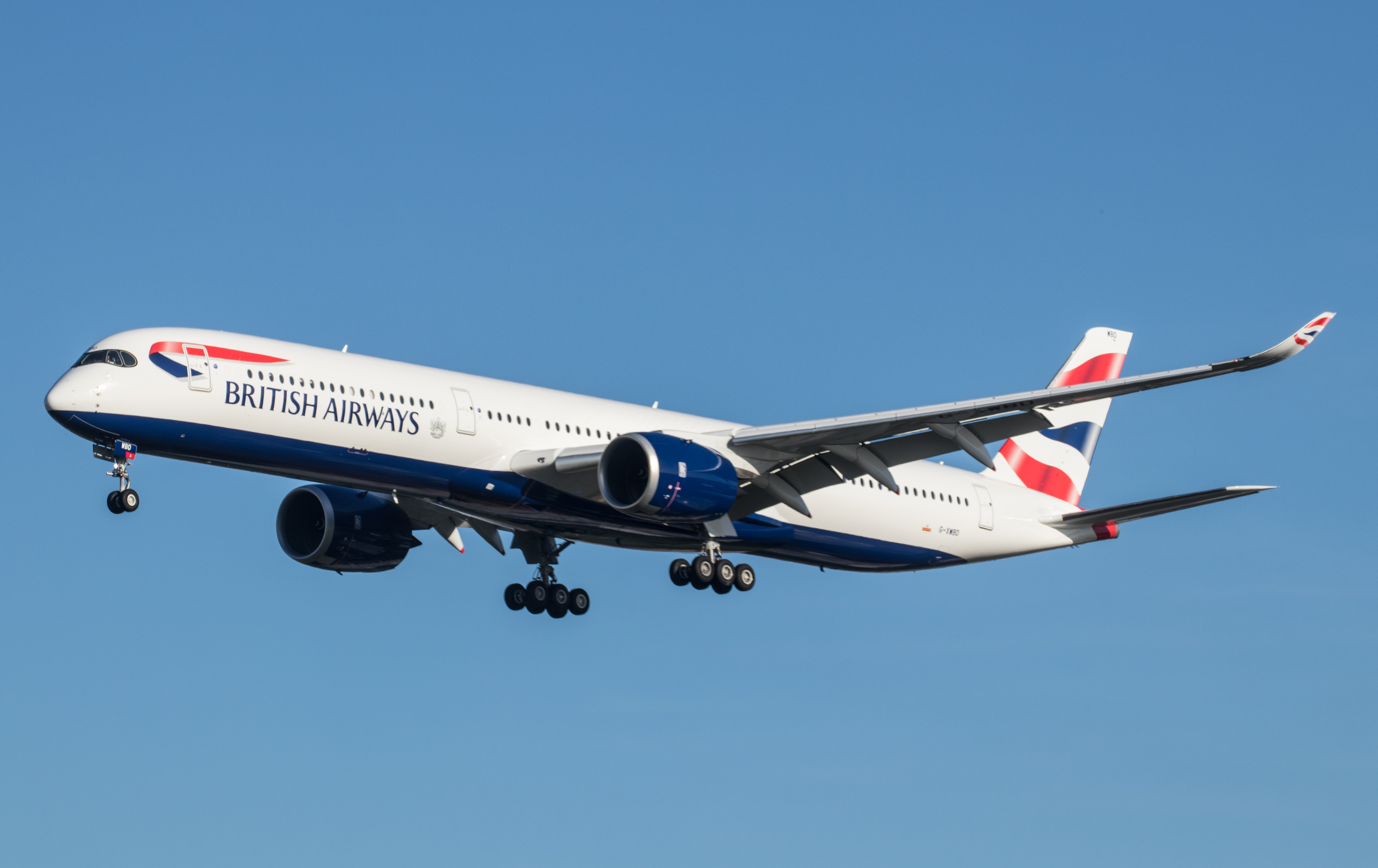
- A British Airways plane

Cyberattack event
- Date: 22 June 2018 – 5 September 2018
- Target: British Airways
- Outcome: Personal and payment card data accessed; ICO fine (£20m) and 2021 group litigation settlement
- Losses: ~429,612 individuals' personal data potentially accessed; ~244,000 customers' payment card details exposed

In 2018, the UK flag carrier British Airways suffered a cyberattack in which the personal and financial details of hundreds of thousands of customers who made bookings on BA's website and mobile application were stolen. Subsequent investigations by the United Kingdom Information Commissioner's Office (ICO) found that the attacker was in a position to access personal data relating to about 429,612 individuals, including roughly 244,000 customers whose names, addresses, payment card numbers, expiry dates and card verification values (CVVs) were exposed.

The attacker first accessed British Airways' network in June 2018 using compromised credentials for a third-party supplier and then moved laterally through a Citrix-based remote access system after exploiting system vulnerabilities. They discovered that British Airways had been logging payment card data for certain transactions in plaintext (not encrypted) since 2015, and later modified JavaScript code on the airline's payment pages so that card data entered by customers was copied to an attacker-controlled website while bookings appeared to complete normally. Cybersecurity firm RiskIQ, among others, linked the attack to the web-skimming group known as Magecart.

The breach was a high-profile test of the General Data Protection Regulation (GDPR) for a major airline. In 2019 the ICO announced its intention to fine British Airways £183.39 million; after further analysis and consideration of mitigating factors this was reduced to a £20 million penalty issued in October 2020. The incident also led to group litigation on behalf of affected customers, described by claimant law firms as the largest personal-data group action in UK history, which was settled out of court in 2021.

== Context ==
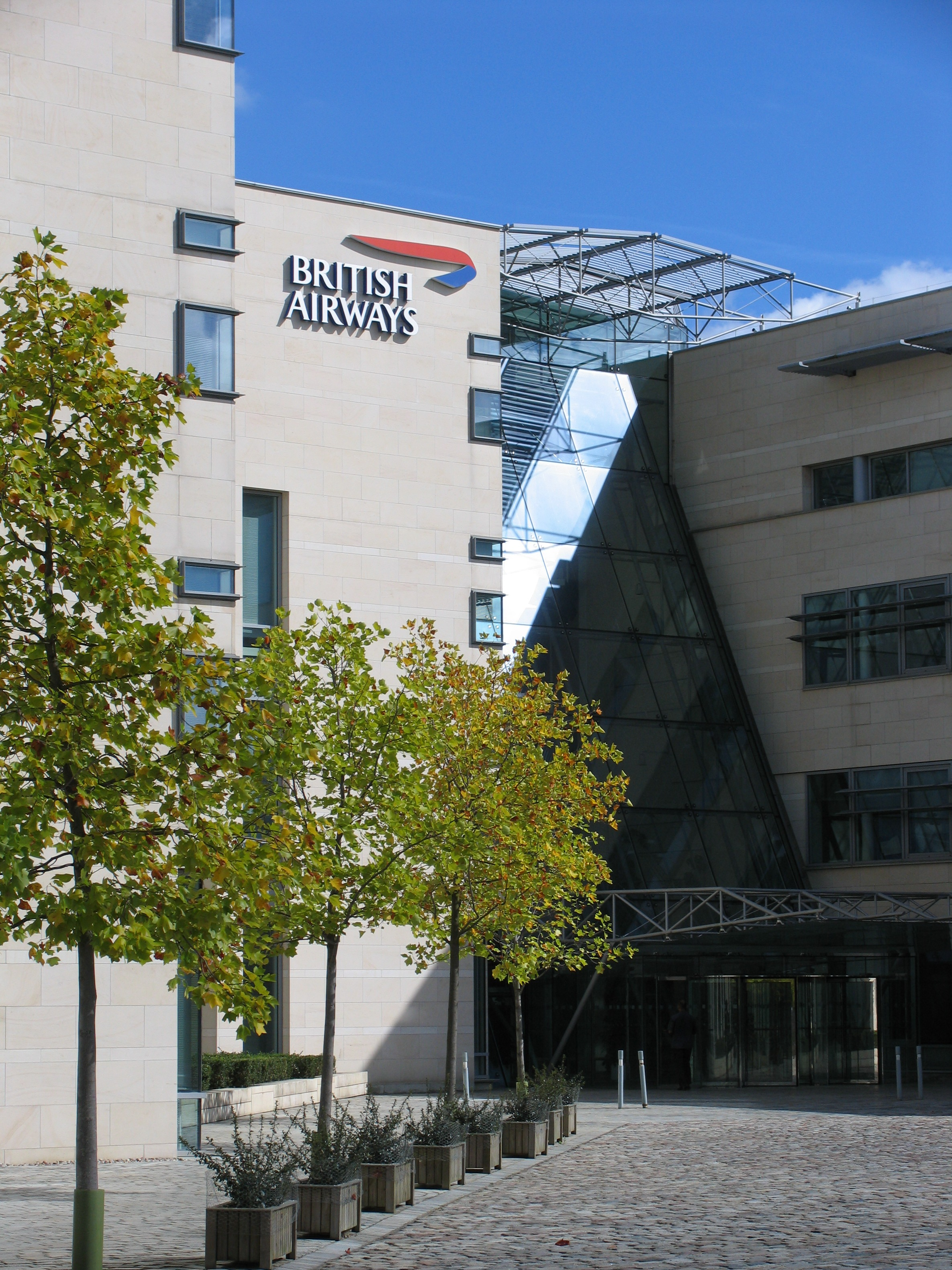
Waterside, the head office building of British Airways

British Airways (BA) is the flag carrier of the United Kingdom. It is headquartered in London, England at Waterside, near its main hub at Heathrow Airport.

At the time of the 2018 data breach, British Airways' reputation had been affected by several high-profile operational disruptions, including a major IT systems outage in May 2017 that led to hundreds of flight cancellations from Heathrow and Gatwick and stranded tens of thousands of passengers worldwide.

The data breach also occurred soon after the General Data Protection Regulation (GDPR) came into force across the European Union on 25 May 2018. GDPR introduced stricter obligations on organisations that act as controllers or processors of personal data and allowed regulators to impose administrative fines of up to 4 percent of annual worldwide turnover or €20 million, whichever is higher.

== Timeline ==
On 22 June 2018, an attacker gained access to the British Airways network by means of compromised login details—a stolen username and password—from an employee of Swissport, a third-party cargo handler. The compromised account did not have multi-factor authentication (MFA) enabled, a security measure that requires a second step in addition to a password, such as a code sent to a phone. British Airways later found that the attacker had compromised five such Swissport accounts.

The accounts allowed the attacker to access only a limited set of applications and data within a virtual environment provided by the Citrix platform, which British Airways used to let staff and partners run internal applications over the internet. However, the attacker was able to break out of that environment. Having done so, they found a file containing the username and password of a highly privileged user saved to a file that could be accessed by any user of the domain.

On 26 June 2018, the attacker was able to find the username and password for a database System Administrator.

On 26 July 2018, the attacker was able to access text files containing payment card details for British Airways redemption transactions. The UK Information Commissioner's Office's report highlighted this issue:

The logging and storing of these card details (including, in most cases, CVV codes) was not an intended design feature of British Airways' systems and was not required for any particular business purpose.

It was a testing feature that was only intended to operate when the systems were not live, but which was left activated when the systems went live. British Airways has explained that this card data was being stored in plaintext (as opposed to in encrypted form) as a result of human error. This error meant that the system had been unnecessarily logging payment card details since December 2015.

The impact of this failure was mitigated to some extent by the fact that the retention period of the logs was 95 days, which meant that the only accessible card details were those logged within the preceding 95 days. Nevertheless, the details of approximately 108,000 payment cards were potentially available to the Attacker.

Because this information was stored in plaintext—not encrypted—anyone who could read the logs could see the full card details.

Between 14 August 2018 and 25 August 2018, the attacker was able to add 22 lines of JavaScript code to the British Airways website so that customer payment information would be funneled to a website controlled by the attacker (titled "BAways", whereas the official site is www.britishairways.com).

=== Discovery ===
On 5 September 2018, a third party informed British Airways that data from its website was being sent to a third-party site, indicating that the site had been compromised. Within 90 minutes, British Airways removed the malicious code.

British Airways has not publicly identified the third party. According to reporting in The Independent, the airline said only that "a third party noticed some unusual activity and informed us about it", and the newspaper understood the third-party to be a company, possibly another airline, that had seen a high volume of attempted fraudulent transactions and traced them back to British Airways.

On 6 September, British Airways informed the ICO and 496,636 affected customers. British Airways issued a public statement saying that it was "investigating, as a matter of urgency, the theft of customer data from its website, ba.com and the airline's mobile app", and that the stolen data did not include travel or passport details but concerned around 380,000 payment cards. The statement said that the breach had been resolved, the website was operating functionally, and that British Airways had notified the police and relevant authorities and was contacting affected customers.

On 7 September, British Airways said the attack affected bookings from 21 August 2018 to 5 September 2018 with credit card details of around 380,000 total customers being compromised. The attackers obtained names, street addresses, email addresses, credit card numbers, expiry dates and card security codes – enough to allow malicious actors to steal from accounts. About 77,000 customers had their name, address, email address and detailed payment information taken, while around 108,000 people had personal details compromised which did not include card security codes.

British Airways urged customers to contact their banks or credit card issuer and to follow their advice. NatWest said that it received more calls than usual because of the breach. American Express said that customers would not need to take any action and that they would alert customers with unusual activity on their cards.

== Perpetrators ==
Cybersecurity firm RiskIQ, as reported by InfoQ, attributed the British Airways compromise to Magecart, a loose collective of criminal groups known for injecting web-skimming JavaScript into online payment pages. Likewise, Wired described the attackers as a hacking group called Magecart, which added 22 lines of code to British Airways' checkout page to divert payment details to the domain.

== Impact ==
The attacker was in a position to access the personal data of 429,612 individuals, including the name, address, card number and CVV number of 244,000 BA customers; the CVV and card number only of 77,000 customers; and the card number only of 108,000 customers.

== Legal consequences ==
In 2019, the UK Information Commissioner's Office (ICO) announced it intended to issue a fine for 1.5% of the airline's 2017 turnover, amounting to £183.39 million, for what it described as "poor security arrangements" that had allowed the attacker to access customer data. Subsequent legal analysis noted that this provisional figure was calculated using both the ICO's published Regulatory Action Policy (RAP) and an unpublished Draft Internal Procedure (DIP) that based fines on an organisation's turnover; after British Airways objected to the use of the DIP, the ICO recalculated the penalty using only the data.Under that framework, the ICO set a starting figure of £30 million, then reduced it by £6 million to reflect mitigating steps taken by British Airways and by a further £4 million under its policy on financial hardship during the COVID-19 pandemic, resulting in the final £20 million fine issued on 16 October 2020.

Information Commissioner Elizabeth Denham was quoted as saying:

"People's personal data is just that – personal. When an organization fails to protect it from loss, damage or theft it is more than an inconvenience. That's why the law is clear – when you are entrusted with personal data you must look after it. Those that don't will face scrutiny from my office to check they have taken appropriate steps to protect fundamental privacy rights".

In 2021, the law firm Pogust Goodhead announced that they were representing a group of British Airways customers who had been affected by the breach in "the largest group-action personal-data claim in UK history". The case was settled out of court.
