= Pingdom =

Swedish website monitoring software company

- Company type: Subsidiary
- Website type: Website monitoring
- Owner: SolarWinds
- Website: pingdom.com
- Commercial: Yes
- Registration: Required
- Users: 500,000 (2014)
- Launched: 2005; 21 years ago
- Current status: Active

Pingdom AB is a Swedish website monitoring software as a service company launched in Stockholm and later acquired by the Austin, Texas–based SolarWinds. The company releases annual reports on global internet use, which are frequently cited in academic publications and by media organizations as a source of Internet-related statistics.

== History ==
Pingdom was launched in 2005 in Västerås, Sweden, but only became popular in 2007. The website monitoring company was founded by the Swedish entrepreneur Sam Nurmi, who had previously founded Loopia Web Hosting and who would go on to found Dooer. As of 2012, the company reported sales of 22.5 million Swedish kronor. By 2014, the company, then owned by the private equity firm Nurmi Drive controlled by its CEO, reported 500,000 customers in 211 countries and employed 30 people. In June 2014, the software company was acquired by the Austin, Texas-based software developer SolarWinds for $103 million.

In May 2017, SolarWinds acquired the San Francisco-based company Scout Server Monitoring and merged the software with Pingdom.

== Product and reports ==
Pingdom has servers located in several countries used to measure the latency of the websites it monitors. It can report whether a website is down due to network splits or failure in DNS servers. Pingdom functions by regularly accessing websites to check whether the site is accessible to users. The software will continuously monitor the website at higher rates until it determines that it is again operational. Pingdom also generates a report detailing how long the site was down. The user receives an email notifying them of any downtime as soon as it occurs and again when it ends. The monitoring tool can also determine how long it takes a website to load fully, how many files it constitutes, and the number of scripts and images required to load.

Pingdom publishes reports on global Internet use and country-specific data on visitors to popular websites like Facebook. The report also includes data on the location of the hosts for many of the most visited websites in the world as determined by Alexa Internet. In 2012, Pingdom was able to determine that about 43.1% of the top 1 million websites were hosted in the United States, compared to the 31.3% hosted in all of Europe. The company also publishes Royal Pingdom, a blog on a variety of Internet-related topics. Royal Pingdom is frequently cited in academic publications and by media organizations as a source of statistics on a variety of websites.

== Reception ==
In its September 2017 review of the service, PC Magazine praised the software as "fast and comprehensive", pointing out that "the only downside is that all this goodness is wrapped in a difficult interface that requires a steep learning curve to leverage."
