= Loggly =

Cloud-based log management and analytics service provider

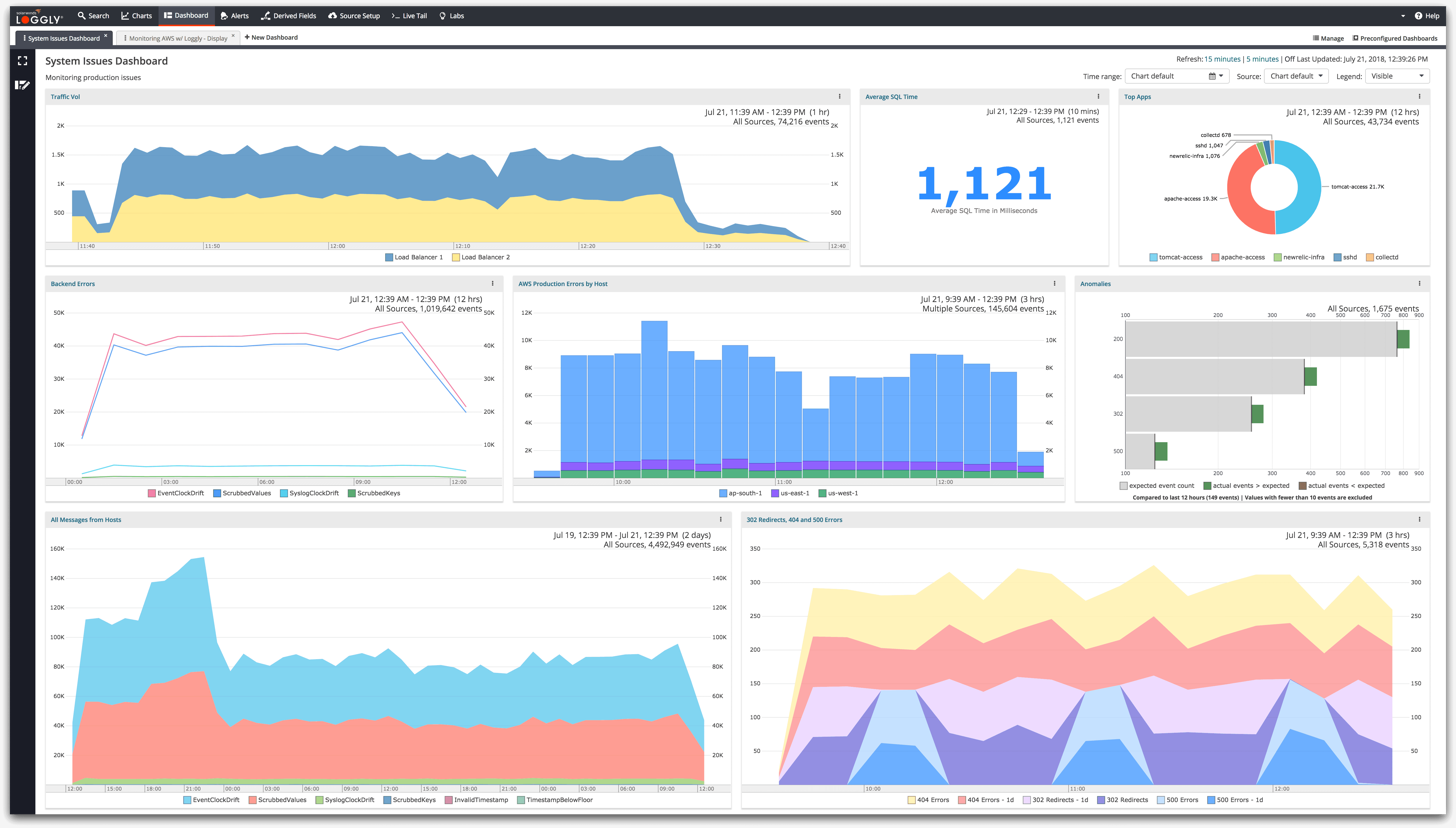
- Website type: Subsidiary
- Founded: 2009
- Headquarters: San Francisco, California, USA
- Key people: Charlie Oppenheimer (Former CEO); Jon Gifford (Former Co-Founder & Chief Search Officer); Manoj Chaudhary (Former CTO & Vice President of Engineering)
- Industry: Computer software, Enterprise software, log management and intelligence
- Services: Log Management and Intelligence, Log Analysis
- Parent: SolarWinds
- Website: www.loggly.com

SolarWinds Loggly is a cloud-based log management and analytics service provider based in San Francisco, California. Jon Gifford, Raffael Marty, and Kord Campbell founded the company in 2009, and Charlie Oppenheimer was the CEO of Loggly until its announced acquisition by SolarWinds (as part of the SolarWinds Cloud division of brands) on January 8, 2018.

== History ==
In 2009, Jon Gifford, Raffael Marty, and Kord Campbell founded Loggly.

In September 2012, App47, a mobile application management provider, partnered with Loggly. The company chose Loggly because of its software-as-a-service (SaaS) deployment option.

On January 8, 2018, the company announced that they are now part of SolarWinds.

== Funding ==
In September 2013, Loggly released "Generation 2", an updated version of its service. The update included log collection through standard syslog protocols and a graphical web interface that allowed users to use a point-and-click process to find log events and generate charts. The same month, Loggly completed a $10.5 million funding round led by Cisco and Data Collective. Trinity Ventures, True Ventures, and Matrix Partners also participated in the round.

In October 2014, the company announced a $15 million Series C funding round led by Harmony Partners. Matrix Partners, Trinity Ventures, Cisco, Data Collective, and True Ventures also participated. The funding round raised Loggly's total investment funding to $33.4 million. The company released Loggly Dynamic Field Explorer, a new user experience that aims to reduce the time developers spend on identifying and troubleshooting problems, that month.

== Operations ==
Loggly is headquartered in San Francisco, California. The company had 54 employees and 10,000 customers in October 2017. Loggly records log data from any device and reports it in a real-time management platform with trend data.

Loggly is a cloud-based log management service provider. It does not require the use of proprietary software agents to collect log data. The service uses open-source technologies, including Elasticsearch, Apache Lucene 4 and Apache Kafka.

== See also ==
- Splunk
- Sumo Logic
