= Thomas Rid =

German political scientist

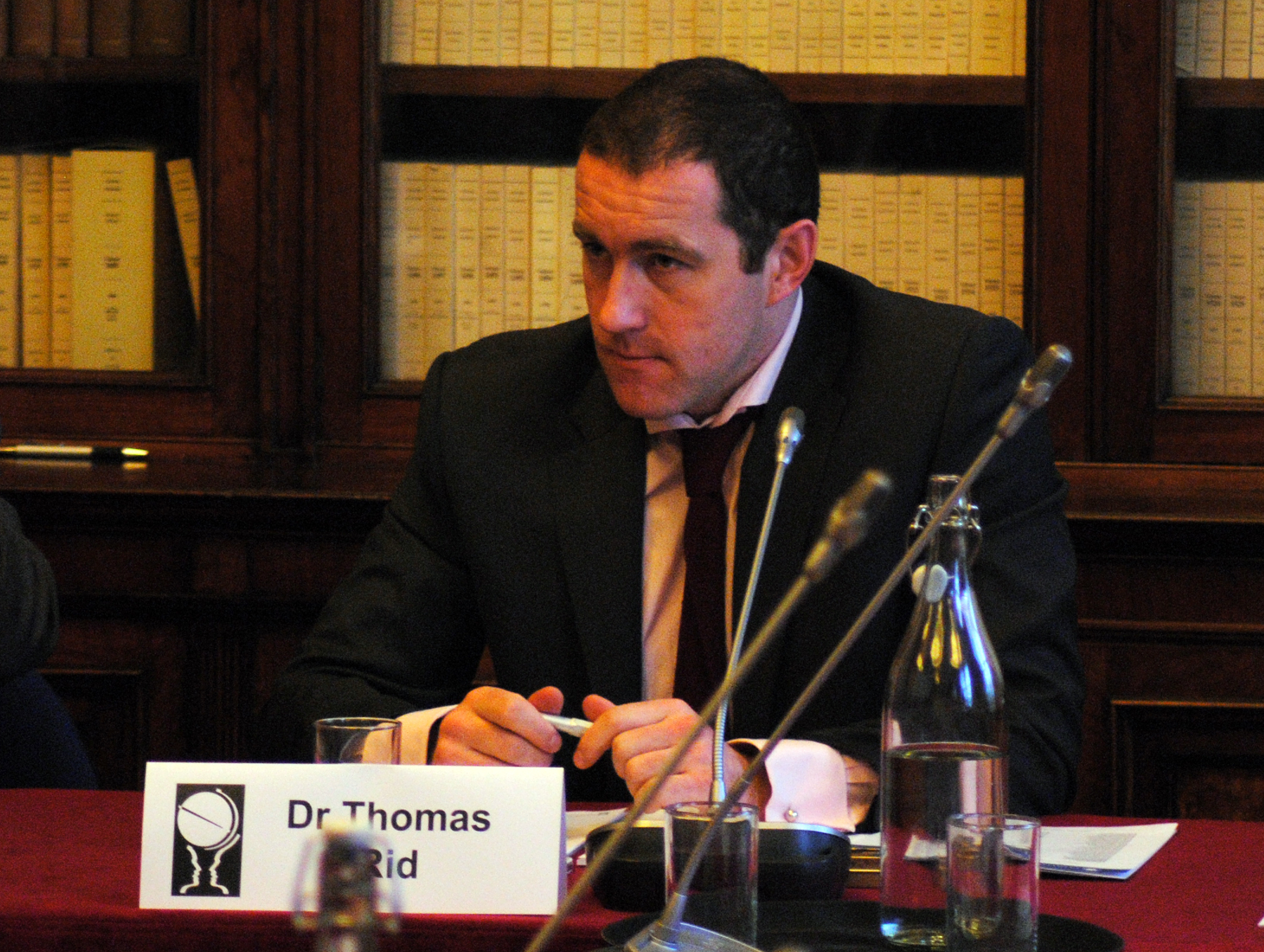
- Cyber Security and Global Interdependence: "What is Critical?", Chatham House, 28 February 2013
- Born: 1975 (age 50–51); Aach, Baden-Württemberg, Germany

Academic background
- Education: Humboldt University of Berlin

Academic work
- Institutions: Johns Hopkins University; King's College London
- Website: ridt.co

Thomas Rid (born 1975) is a German political scientist known for his work on the history and risks of information technology in conflict. He is Professor of Strategic Studies at the Paul H. Nitze School of Advanced International Studies. Previously he was a professor of security studies at the Department of War Studies, King's College London.

== Biography ==
Rid grew up in the rural region of the Hegau, close to Lake Constance and the Germany–Switzerland border. In 1994 he graduated (Abitur) from the Nellenburg Gymnasium in Stockach. From 1997 to 2002 he studied social and political science (with Herfried Münkler) at the Humboldt University of Berlin, and for one year at the London School of Economics. From 2003 to 2005 he was a Fritz Thyssen Foundation Scholar with the German Institute for International and Security Affairs, Germany's major government-funded foreign policy think tank, where he wrote his dissertation and first book. He received his Ph.D. from Humboldt University of Berlin in 2006.

In 2006-2007 Rid was a postdoctoral fellow at the Institut français des relations internationales (Ifri), a Paris-based think tank dedicated to international affairs. In 2007-2008 he was a postdoc at the RAND Corporation, at the Paul H. Nitze School of Advanced International Studies (SAIS) of Johns Hopkins University, and in 2009 a public policy scholar at the Woodrow Wilson International Center for Scholars. In 2009 and 2010 Rid was in Israel conducting research as a visiting scholar at the Hebrew University of Jerusalem and at the Shalem Center. In 2010 to 2011, he was fellow at the Institute for Advanced Study at the University of Konstanz in Germany.

From 2011 to 2016 he researched and taught at the Department of War Studies at King's College. In 2016, he became a professor of strategic studies at the Paul H. Nitze School of Advanced International Studies (SAIS) of Johns Hopkins University.

In October 2011 the Journal of Strategic Studies, a leading international relations journal, published his provocatively titled article, "Cyber War Will Not Take Place". The text argued that all politically motivated cyber attacks are merely sophisticated versions of sabotage, espionage, or subversion—but not war. In a review of his 2013 book with the same title, The Economist considered Rid "one of Britain's leading authorities on, and sceptics about, cyber-warfare".

In 2016, Rid authored an article entitled "How Russia Pulled Off the Biggest Election Hack in U.S. History" and in 2020, authored a book entitled Active Measures: The Secret History of Disinformation and Political Warfare about Soviet and Russian active measures. In 2020, Rid wrote in his Washington Post column that the valuable lessons from 2016 were: We must treat the Hunter Biden leaks as if they were a foreign intelligence operation — even if they probably aren't.

== Selected publications ==
- Active Measures: The Secret History of Disinformation and Political Warfare, New York: Farrar, Straus and Giroux, 21 April 2020
- How Russia Pulled Off the Biggest Election Hack in U.S. History, Esquire magazine, 20 October 2016
- Rise of the Machines. A Cybernetic History, New York/London: W.W. Norton/Scribe, 2016
- Cryptopolitik and the Darknet, with Daniel Moore, Survival, 2016, February/March, vol 57, iss 1, 7–38
- Attributing Cyber Attacks, with Ben Buchanan, Journal of Strategic Studies, 2015, February, vol 39, iss 1, p. 4-37
- OMG Cyber! with Rob Lee, The RUSI Journal, November/December 2014, vol 159, iss 5, p. 4–12
- Cyber War Will Not Take Place, New York/London: Oxford University Press/Hurst, 2013
- Deterrence Beyond the State. The Israeli Experience, Contemporary Security Policy, April 2012, vol 33, iss 1, p. 124-147
- The Nineteenth Century Origins of Counterinsurgency Doctrine, Journal of Strategic Studies, October 2010, vol 33, iss 5, p. 727-758
- War and Media Operations. The US Military and the Press from Vietnam to Iraq, Series: Cass military studies. London: Routledge, 2007
