= Austin McChord =

American businessman and entrepreneur (born 1985)

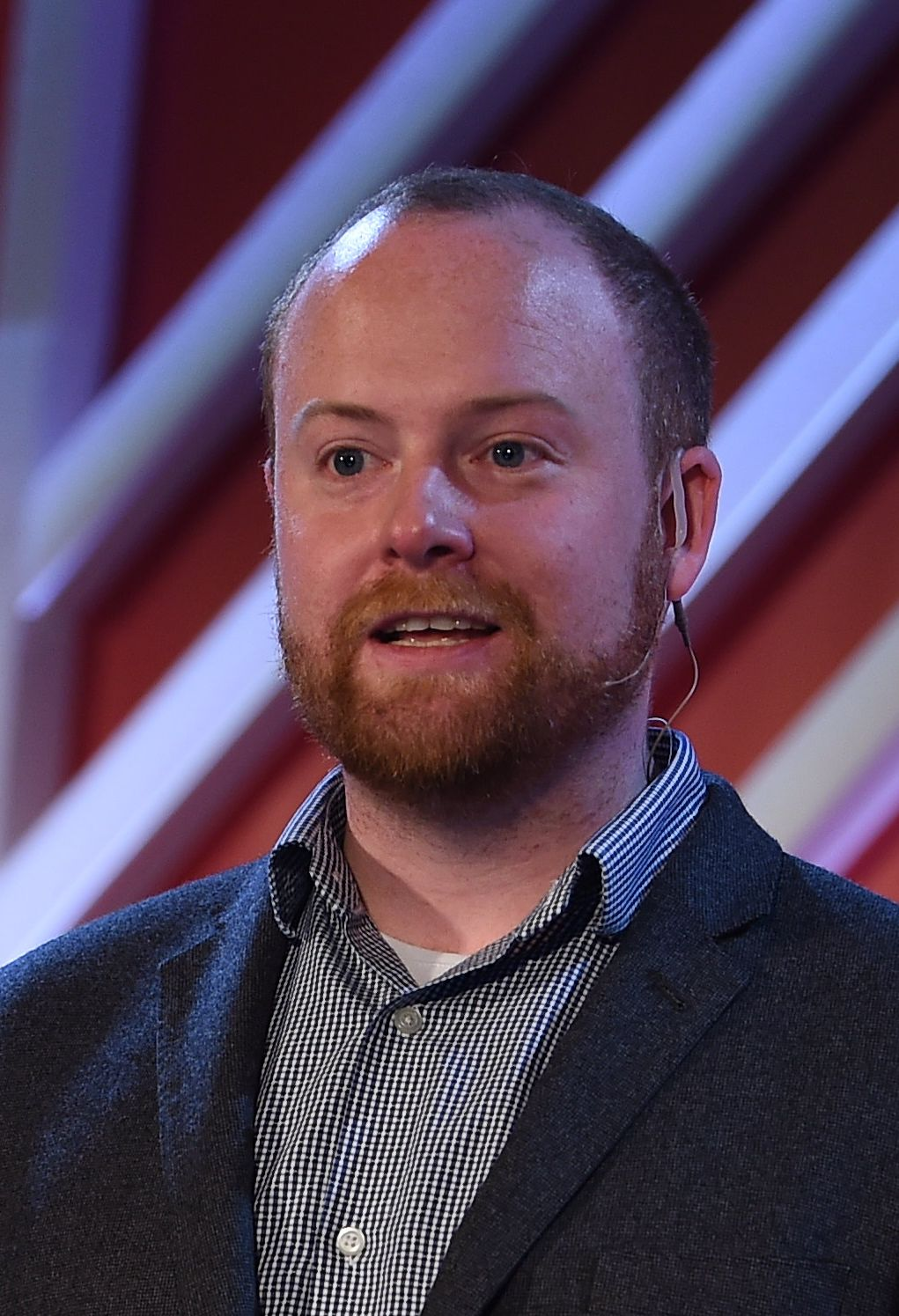
- McChord in 2018
- Born: October 8, 1985 (age 40); Newtown, Connecticut, U.S.
- Education: Newtown High School
- Alma mater: Rochester Institute of Technology (BS)
- Occupations: Entrepreneur; venture capitalist; software engineer
- Years active: 2007–present
- Known for: Founding Datto; CEO of Casana; Founding National Havoc Robot League
- Website: outsidersfund.com

Austin McChord (born October 8, 1985) is an American entrepreneur, venture capitalist, and computer engineer. He founded Datto, a data backup company, in 2007 and served as its CEO until 2018. By 2015, Datto became Connecticut's first unicorn company with a valuation exceeding $1 billion. The company was sold to Vista Equity Partners in 2017 for approximately $1.5 billion, went public in 2020, and was ultimately acquired by Kaseya in 2022 for $6.2 billion.

Since leaving Datto, McChord has become CEO of Casana, a healthcare technology company developing in-home health monitoring devices, and co-founded Outsiders Fund, an early-stage venture capital firm. He also founded the National Havoc Robot League, a robot combat organization.

== Early life and education ==
McChord was born in 1985 and grew up in Newtown, Connecticut. He developed an interest in technology in third grade, when his school had him use a computer to compensate for his poor handwriting. He soon began learning to program and wrote games to play during class.

In middle school, McChord constructed Rube Goldberg machines. At Newtown High School, he joined the Technology Club as a freshman. The club operated the local television station broadcast to the town, which McChord helped upgrade from scrolling text to live TV and sports replays. He collected old television sets, repaired them, and built components for live sports broadcasts, also developing the school's video-editing software.

After graduating high school in 2003, McChord enrolled at the Rochester Institute of Technology, initially studying electrical engineering before switching majors. In 2009, he received a Bachelor of Science degree in bioinformatics.

== Career ==
=== Datto ===
While still attending college in the summer of 2007, the 21-year-old McChord began developing a data recovery and backup device in his father's civil engineering office basement in Wilton, Connecticut. He fashioned his first product using Linksys parts, Lego pieces, hot glue, a soldering iron, and custom software. The device took frequent snapshots of clients' server content, encrypted the data, and transmitted it to backup servers, allowing for quick recovery if client servers were compromised.

McChord founded Datto in 2007 to commercialize the product, which launched in early 2008. Early coverage in technology blogs such as Engadget and Gizmodo brought the company its first customers. He initially built a Linux-compatible backup device marketed to a small number of managed service providers (MSPs), before expanding the product line.

In early 2013, McChord turned down a $100 million buyout offer from an unnamed security firm, reportedly because the firm planned to dismantle the company and lay off employees. That fall, McChord instead raised $25 million from General Catalyst Partners, with Paul Sagan and Steve Herrod joining Datto's board. In December 2014, Datto acquired Backupify, a Massachusetts-based startup that backed up data in cloud applications such as Salesforce and Google Apps.

After a Federal Bureau of Investigation (FBI) request and permission from the Hillary Clinton campaign, in September 2015 McChord's company turned over up to 17,448 Clinton emails from Datto's servers to the FBI, along with associated hardware, as part of an investigation into Clinton's use of a private email server.

Datto received $75 million in funding from Technology Crossover Ventures in November 2015. By 2015, the company had achieved a valuation exceeding $1 billion, making it Connecticut's first unicorn.

In December 2017, Datto was sold to Vista Equity Partners for approximately $1.5 billion and merged with Autotask, with McChord appointed CEO of the combined company. McChord stepped down as CEO in October 2018, with Tim Weller succeeding him, but remained on the board of directors.

Datto went public on the New York Stock Exchange on October 21, 2020, under the ticker symbol "MSP," raising approximately $594 million in its initial public offering. McChord participated in the opening bell ceremony alongside CEO Tim Weller. In June 2022, Kaseya completed its acquisition of Datto for $6.2 billion.

=== Casana ===
In 2020, McChord became CEO of Casana, a healthcare technology startup focused on in-home health monitoring. The company, originally called Heart Health Intelligence, was founded by Nicholas Conn during his doctoral studies at RIT and is headquartered in Rochester, New York.

Casana's primary product is the Heart Seat, a smart toilet seat that monitors cardiovascular health metrics including heart rate and blood oxygen saturation without requiring any action from the user. The device received FDA 510(k) clearance in May 2023 for measuring heart rate and oxygen saturation, becoming the first smart toilet seat to receive such approval.

Casana has raised more than $46 million in funding, including a $14 million Series A round led by General Catalyst and Outsiders Fund in 2021, and a $30 million Series B round led by Morningside in 2022.

=== Outsiders Fund ===
McChord is a co-founder and managing director of Outsiders Fund, an early-stage venture capital firm established in 2020. The firm focuses on identifying opportunities where technology can disrupt traditional, incumbent industries, seeking founders with unconventional backgrounds.

After stepping down from Datto in 2018, McChord spent time as a venture partner at General Catalyst, focusing on early-stage investments on the East Coast, before establishing Outsiders Fund.

=== National Havoc Robot League ===
In late 2018, McChord founded the Norwalk Havoc Robot League, later renamed the National Havoc Robot League (NHRL), a robot combat organization based in Norwalk, Connecticut. The league hosts tournaments featuring robots in 3-pound, 12-pound, and 30-pound weight classes competing in enclosed arenas.

In 2020, McChord purchased a warehouse in South Norwalk to serve as the league's headquarters, known as the "House of Havoc." The facility has grown to include multiple combat arenas, a production studio for live streaming, spectator seating, and a museum of historic combat robots. NHRL competitions are broadcast on YouTube and TikTok, attracting competitors from around the world.

McChord has used NHRL as a vehicle for philanthropy, pledging $1 million in 2022 to STEM charities chosen by championship finalists, with additional $1 million grants to collegiate robotics teams in 2023. McChord occasionally competes in NHRL events with unconventional robots incorporating liquid nitrogen or jet engines.

== Philanthropy ==
In December 2017, McChord donated $50 million to RIT, the largest gift in the university's history. The donation funded the creation of RIT's Global Cybersecurity Institute (GCI), contributed to The SHED (Student Hall for Exploration and Development), and established the Gap Year Entrepreneurship Fellows Program.

McChord also established four endowed awards at RIT, naming them after his grade school teachers from Newtown, Connecticut: the John Vouros Endowed Scholarship, Al Washicko Endowed Professorship, Kevin O'Sullivan Endowed Professorship, and Jennifer Tarabulski Endowed Graduate Fellowship in Cybersecurity.

In 2017, McChord was recognized by The Chronicle of Philanthropy as one of the nation's top 50 philanthropists.

== Honors and awards ==
- 2015 – Forbes 30 Under 30 in Enterprise Technology
- 2015 – Connecticut Magazine 40 Under 40
- 2016 – Ernst & Young Entrepreneur of the Year, New York (Technology)
- 2017 – RIT Commencement Speaker
- 2017 – Chronicle of Philanthropy Philanthropy 50
- 2023 – RIT Outstanding Alumni Award

== Personal life ==
McChord and his wife Allison live in Norwalk, Connecticut. His hobbies include building drones and robots.

In 2024, the McChords established Manresa Island Corporation, a nonprofit organization with plans to transform Manresa Island in Norwalk, the site of a decommissioned power plant, into a publicly accessible park.
