= Dutch Institute for Vulnerability Disclosure =

Non-profit organization in the Netherlands

- Formation: 26 September 2019
- Key people: Victor Gevers; Astrid Oosenbrug
- Website: divd.nl

The Dutch Institute for Vulnerability Disclosure (DIVD) is an organization from the Netherlands focused on coordinated vulnerability disclosure.

Since 2022, it is a CVE Numbering Authority. The DIVD was involved in disclosing vulnerabilities to Kaseya, before their ransomware attack occurred.
