= NHRL =

NHRL could refer to:

- National Havoc Robot League
- National Hurricane Research Laboratory
