= Online Armor Personal Firewall =

Online Armor
- Online Armor 4.0.0.10 Free running on Windows XP with Service Pack 3
- Developers: Emsisoft Ltd, Tall Emu Pty Ltd
- Stable release: 7.0.0.1866 / 15 October 2013; 12 years ago
- Operating system: 32-bit versions of Windows 7, Windows Vista and Windows XP and 64bit on Windows 7 and Windows 8
- Size: Online Armor Free: 21 MB; Online Armor Premium: 21 MB; Online Armor ++: 21 MB
- Available in: English, Italian, French, Dutch
- Type: Personal firewall, Antivirus software, Spyware removal software
- License: Online Armor Free: Freeware; Online Armor Premium: Shareware
- Website: https://www.emsisoft.com/en/software/oa/

Online Armor Personal Firewall was a firewall originally developed by Australian company Tall Emu, until the program was sold to Emsi Software GmbH (now Emsisoft). The program provides protection on a Microsoft Windows operating system from both inbound and outbound attacks. There are three editions of this product:

- Online Armor Free is freeware but is licensed for personal use only and has a limited featureset.
- Online Armor Premium is a more comprehensive commercial firewall that includes anti-phishing and anti-spam capabilities.

== Overview ==
In an independent proactive security challenge test performed by matousec.com, Online Armor Premium received a score of 99%, surpassing more well-known firewalls, such as ZoneAlarm and Kaspersky Internet Security. A well known vulnerability profiling site and company, Secunia, had not found any vulnerabilities as of March 2008 in the software, though Matousec reported a weakness 25 March 2008 that has been repaired in the latest version.

Online Armor has gained both negative and positive feedback with some users reporting serious compatibility problems with certain programs, such as F-Secure and Ad Muncher, as noted in the product website, but also receiving praise for its free online support and for its swift response to problems.

== End of Support ==
On 31 March 2015 Emsisoft announced that they had discontinued selling new licenses for Online Armor, that it would only be possible to activate new license keys until the end of May 2015, and that support for Online Armor would officially end after 31 March 2016.

== See also ==
- Internet Security
