= Datto =

Datto can refer to:

- Datto, Arkansas
- Datu, a title which denotes the rulers of numerous indigenous peoples throughout the Philippine archipelago
- Dattus (fl. 1009-1020) a Lombard leader from Bari
- Datto (company), technology company
