= Kaseya VSA ransomware attack =

July 2021 ransomware attack

On 2 July 2021, about 60 managed service providers (MSPs) and their customers became victims of a ransomware attack perpetrated by the REvil group, causing downtime for over 1,000 companies. REvil carried out the attack by exploiting a vulnerability in VSA (Virtual System Administrator), a remote monitoring and management software package developed by Kaseya. This was a form of supply chain attack on a software supply chain. REvil demanded about 70 million USD in Bitcoin as a ransom. On 23 July 2021, Kaseya announced that it had received a universal decryptor tool from a "trusted third party", and it helped customers restore their data. Kaseya said it did not pay the ransom. Two suspects were identified and one sentenced.

== Timeline and impact ==
=== Vulnerabilities ===
On 23 March 2021, Dutch Institute for Vulnerability Disclosure (DIVD) researcher Wietse Boonstra found six zero-day vulnerabilities in Kaseya VSA (Virtual Systems Administrator), and found another on 2 April. The DIVD contacted Kaseya on 6 April and worked together with company experts to resolve four of the seven reported vulnerabilities. The DIVD later wrote a blog post about finding the zero-days.

=== Attack and response ===
Despite the advance warning from DIVD, Kaseya did not patch all the reported bugs before they were exploited by REvil to deploy ransomware. An authentication bypass vulnerability in the software allowed attackers to compromise VSA on 2 July and distribute a malicious payload through hosts managed by the software, amplifying the reach of the attack. In response, the company shut down its VSA cloud and SaaS servers and issued a security advisory to customers, including those with on-premises deployments of VSA.

Initial reports of companies affected by the incident included Norwegian financial software developer Visma, who manages some systems for Swedish supermarket chain Coop. The supermarket chain had to close down its 800 stores for almost a week, some in small villages without any other food shop. They did not pay ransom, but rebuilt their systems from scratch after waiting for an update from Kaseya.

The REvil ransomware gang officially took credit for the attack and claimed to have encrypted more than one million systems during the incident. On 5 July 2021, REvil announced that they would release a universal decryptor, which would unlock all affected systems, in exchange for a 70 million USD ransom payment paid in Bitcoin. Also on 5 July, Kaseya said that between 800 and 1,500 downstream businesses were impacted in the attack. Along with Coop, impacted organizations included schools in New Zealand, companies in Germany and the United States, and a town in Maryland.

On 4 July 2021, the U.S. Deputy National Security Advisor for Cyber and Emerging Technology, Anne Neuberger, stated that the U.S. Federal Bureau of Investigation (FBI) and Cybersecurity and Infrastructure Security Agency (CISA) were providing assistance to Kaseya and impacted customers. After a 9 July 2021 phone call between United States president Joe Biden and Russian president Vladimir Putin, Biden told the press, "I made it very clear to him that the United States expects when a ransomware operation is coming from his soil even though it's not sponsored by the state, we expect them to act if we give them enough information to act on who that is." Biden later added that the United States would take the group's servers down if Putin did not. CISA released incident response guidance for affected customers on 12 July 2021.

On 13 July 2021, REvil websites and other infrastructure vanished from the internet, although they later returned.

=== Recovery ===
On 23 July, Kaseya announced it had received a universal decryptor key for the REvil-encrypted files from an unnamed "trusted third party" and was helping victims restore their files. Kaseya worked with Emsisoft to create a decryption tool for customers using the key. Kaseya said that it did not pay the ransom. In September 2021, the Washington Post reported that the master key came from the FBI, which had secretly obtained the key earlier.

== Legal action ==
On 8 October 2021, Ukrainian national Yaroslav Vasinskyi was arrested in Poland in connection with the ransomware attack, pending extradition to the United States. On 8 November 2021, the United States Department of Justice unsealed indictments against Yaroslav Vasinskyi, who was still in Polish custody, and another suspect — Russian national Yevgeniy Polyanin. Vasinskyi was charged with conducting ransomware attacks against multiple victims including Kaseya, facing a maximum sentence of 115 years in prison. Polyanin was charged with conducting ransomware attacks against multiple victims including Texas businesses and government entities, facing a maximum sentence of 145 years in prison. In addition, the United States seized over $6 million in ransomware proceeds and collaborated with international law enforcement agencies and private cybersecurity firms to disrupt REvil’s operations.

On 3 March 2022, Yaroslav Vasinskyi was extradited to the United States and arraigned in Texas a few days later. On 1 May 2024, Yaroslav Vasinskyi was sentenced to 13 years and seven months in prison and ordered to pay over $16 million in restitution for "his role in conducting over 2,500 ransomware attacks and demanding over $700 million in ransom payments". Polyanin remained wanted by U.S. authorities; in 2024 the FBI said he was believed to be living in Russia.

In January 2022, Russian authorities arrested 14 people suspected of involvement in running or developing REvil, using information supplied by the United States. In October 2024, four members of the group, Daniil Puzyrevsky, Ruslan Khansvyarov, Aleksey Malozemov and Artem Zayets, were sentenced in Russia to terms of between four and a half and six years. Four further members, Andrey Bessonov, Mikhail Golovachuk, Roman Muromsky and Dmitry Korotayev, admitted guilt and were later convicted by a Russian court of financial fraud and computer crimes. Having been in pretrial detention since their arrests in early 2022, they were released because their sentences were equal to the time they had already spent in custody. According to CyberScoop, the Russian prosecutions concentrated mainly on the illegal use of bank card data, and charges over attacks on foreign companies did not advance.

== Context ==
In 2018, CISA issued a public alert about attackers targeting managed service providers (MSPs) as a way to infiltrate their networks and the networks of their customers. Former Kaseya employees said that they had raised concerns about company security practices between 2017 and 2020, and that there had been smaller ransomware attacks involving VSA in 2018 and 2019.

This attack happened a few months after the May 2021 Colonial Pipeline ransomware attack. It has been compared to the 2020 United States federal government data breach, which involved a supply chain attack on SolarWinds software.
