= Karl Palachuk =

American writer

Karl W. Palachuk
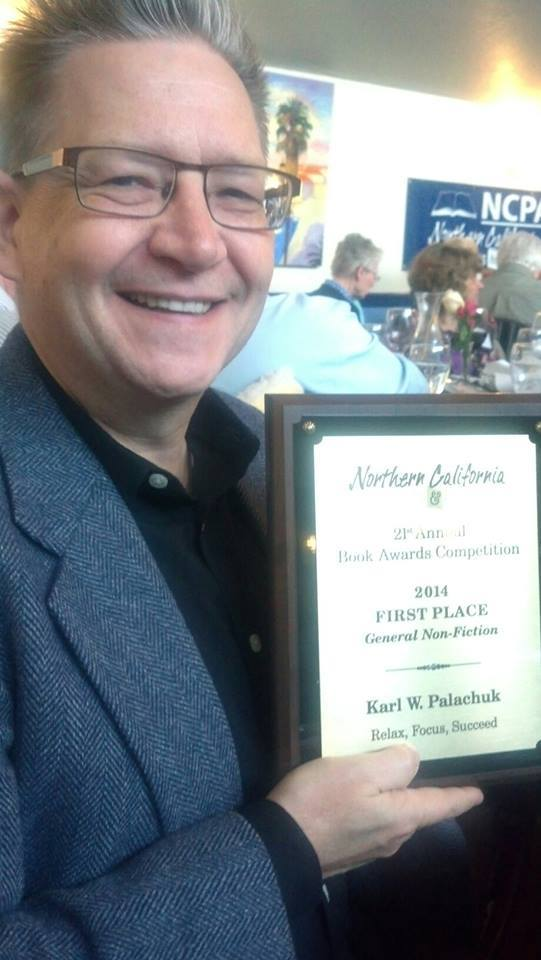
- Born: November 20, 1959 (age 66)
- Education: University of Michigan, Gonzaga University
- Occupations: Author, public speaker, managed services provider (msp) consultant.
- Website: www.karlpalachuk.com

Karl W. Palachuk (born November 20, 1959) is a public speaker and an author, widely recognized as one of the pioneers of managed services. Palachuk has trained technology consultants and business owners all over the world. He's the author of fifteen books, including several of the best-selling books on Amazon for the topic "managed services.”

== Early life and education ==
Karl W. Palachuk was born November 20, 1959, and grew up in Washington State. He received his Bachelor of Arts degree in political science from Gonzaga University in 1982, a Master of Arts degree and became a PhD candidate in political science from the University of Michigan. He is a Microsoft Certified Systems Engineer and a Microsoft Small Business Specialist.

== Career ==
In 1995, Palachuk established KPEnterprises Business Consulting, Inc, a managed services business servicing small to medium size businesses. Palachuk sold the business in 2011. While running KPEnterprises, he pioneered several procedures and practices in the field of managed service providers (MSPs). In 2003, Palachuk created the Great Little Book Publishing Company. In June 2004, he founded the Sacramento Small Business Server User Group with the assistance of Bob Nitrio. It has since become a peer-led group of IT consultants and is now known as the Sacramento SMB IT Pros.

In 2006–2007, Palachuk began teaching his managed services approach to I.T. Consultants at small conferences. He very quickly became an internationally recognized authority. At that time, there were only a few voices advocating the managed services business model, primarily Palachuk, Amy Luby of the Managed Service Provider Services Network (MSPSN), and Erick Simpson of Managed Services Provider University (MSPU).

Palachuk had the first published book on the topic of Managed Services in 2006 (Service Agreements for SMB Consultants: A Quick-Start Guide to Managed Services), followed a few months later by Simpson with A Guide to Managed Services.

Palachuk has been a featured speaker at conferences and seminars over the last ten years.

In addition to Karl has served on partner advisory councils and product development groups at for several large corporations. He is also the founder of the Sacramento SMB IT Professionals organization and an active leader in the IT Professional groups worldwide.

Palachuk started The Killing IT Podcast with Dave Sobel and Ryan Morris in May 2019.

Palachuk founded the National Society of IT Service Providers in 2021 and is the executive director, NSITSP.

== Awards and honors ==
Palachuk has been named to the 2012 SMB as One of The Most Influential People in the Small Business IT Channel, and 30 Must-Follow Small Business IT Influencers in 2019.

== Written works ==
=== Books ===
- The Absolutely Unbreakable Rules of Service Delivery: How to Manage Your Business to Maximize Customer Service, Profit, and Employee Culture - 2020
- The Small Biz Quickstart Workbook: The Ultimate Guide for First-Time Entrepreneurs - 2020
- Business Plan in a Month: Build the Roadmap Your Business Deserves - 2020
- Cloud Services in a Month Managed Services in a Month 3rd Ed. - 2019
- Service Agreements for SMB Consultants: A Quick Start Guide for Managed Services, Revised ed. - 2018
- Service Agreements for SMB Consultants: A Quick Start Guide for Managed Services
- The Nonfiction Book Publishing Plan: The Professional Guide to Profitable Self-Publishing, with Stephanie Chandler - 2018
- The Managed Services Operations Manual: Standard Operating Procedures for Computer Consultants and Managed Service Providers – a Four-Volume Set. Great Little Book Publishing Co., Inc. 2014.
  - The Managed Services Operations Manual - Vol 1: Front Office Mastery - SOPs for Office Management, Finances, Administration, and Running Your Company More Efficiently. Great Little Book Publishing Co., Inc. 2014.
  - The Managed Services Operations Manual - Vol 2: Employees and Internal Processes - SOPs for Hiring, Employee Evaluations, Team Management, and More. Great Little Book Publishing Co., Inc. 2014.
  - The Managed Services Operations Manual - Vol 3: Running the Service Department - SOPs for Managing Technicians, Daily Operations, Service Boards, and Scheduling. Great Little Book Publishing Co., Inc. 2014.
  - The Managed Services Operations Manual - Vol 4: Support and Service Delivery - SOPs for Client Relationships, Service Delivery, Scheduled Maintenance, and All about Backups. Great Little Book Publishing Co., Inc. 2014.
- Project Management in Small Business: How to Deliver Successful, Profitable Projects on Time. Great Little Book Publishing Co., Inc. 2014.
- Relax Focus Succeed, 2nd edition. Great Little Book Publishing Co., Inc. 2013.
- Managed Services in a Month, 2nd edition. Great Little Book Publishing Co., Inc. 2013.
- Servicios Gestionados En Un Mes. Great Little Book Publishing Co., Inc. 2013. 2nd Edition.
- The Network Migration Workbook: Zero Downtime Migration Strategies: Zero Downtime Migration Strategies for Windows Networks, 2nd edition. Great Little Book Publishing Co., Inc. 2012.
- Publish Your First Book: A Quick Start Guide to Professional Publishing in the Digital Age. Great Little Book Publishing Co., Inc. 2011.
- The Super-Good Project Planner for Technical Consultants: An eBook on Practical Project Management. Great Little Book Publishing Co., Inc. 2007.
- Service Agreements for SMB Consultants. Great Little Book Publishing Co., Inc. 2006.
- "The Network Documentation Workbook: A Guide for Small-Medium Business (SMB) Windows Administrators". Great Little Book Publishing Co., Inc. 2005.
- "SAN Primer for SMB". SMB Nation Press. 2006.

=== White papers ===
- Karl's 68-Point Checklist (whitepaper). Great Little Book Publishing Co., Inc. 2012, 2011.
- Karl's Cloud Readiness Checklist (whitepaper). Great Little Book Publishing Co., Inc. 2010.
- Backups Whitepaper (whitepaper). Great Little Book Publishing Co., Inc. 2008.
- HaaS Starter Kit – Hardware as a Service (whitepaper). Great Little Book Publishing Co., Inc. 2007.
