= Newtown High School (Connecticut) =

Location
- 12 Berkshire Road; Sandy Hook, Connecticut 06482; United States; 41°24′36″N 73°16′21″W

Information
- Type: Public high school
- School district: Newtown Public Schools
- CEEB code: 070550
- NCES School ID: 090291000615
- Principal: Kimberly Longobucco
- Teaching staff: 113.05 (FTE)
- Grades: 9–12
- Enrollment: 1,276 (2023–2024)
- Student to teacher ratio: 11.29
- Colors: Blue and gold
- Team name: Nighthawks
- Accreditation: New England Association of Schools and Colleges (1948–)
- Newspaper: The Hawkeye
- Website: www.newtown.k12.ct.us/NHS

Newtown High School is an accredited public high school in Newtown, Connecticut, United States. As of the 2021–2022 school year, the school serves 1,398 students in grades 9–12 and employs 214.6 full-time faculty members. It is the only high school of the Newtown Public Schools.

Newtown High has been accredited by the New England Association of Schools and Colleges since 1948 and was awarded the Blue Ribbon Award for Schools of Excellence in 2000.

In 2021, U.S. News & World Report ranked Newtown High School 21st out of all public high schools in Connecticut. Newtown was also ranked 1,219th in the country, out of almost 24,000 public high schools nationwide.

== History ==
=== Renovations ===
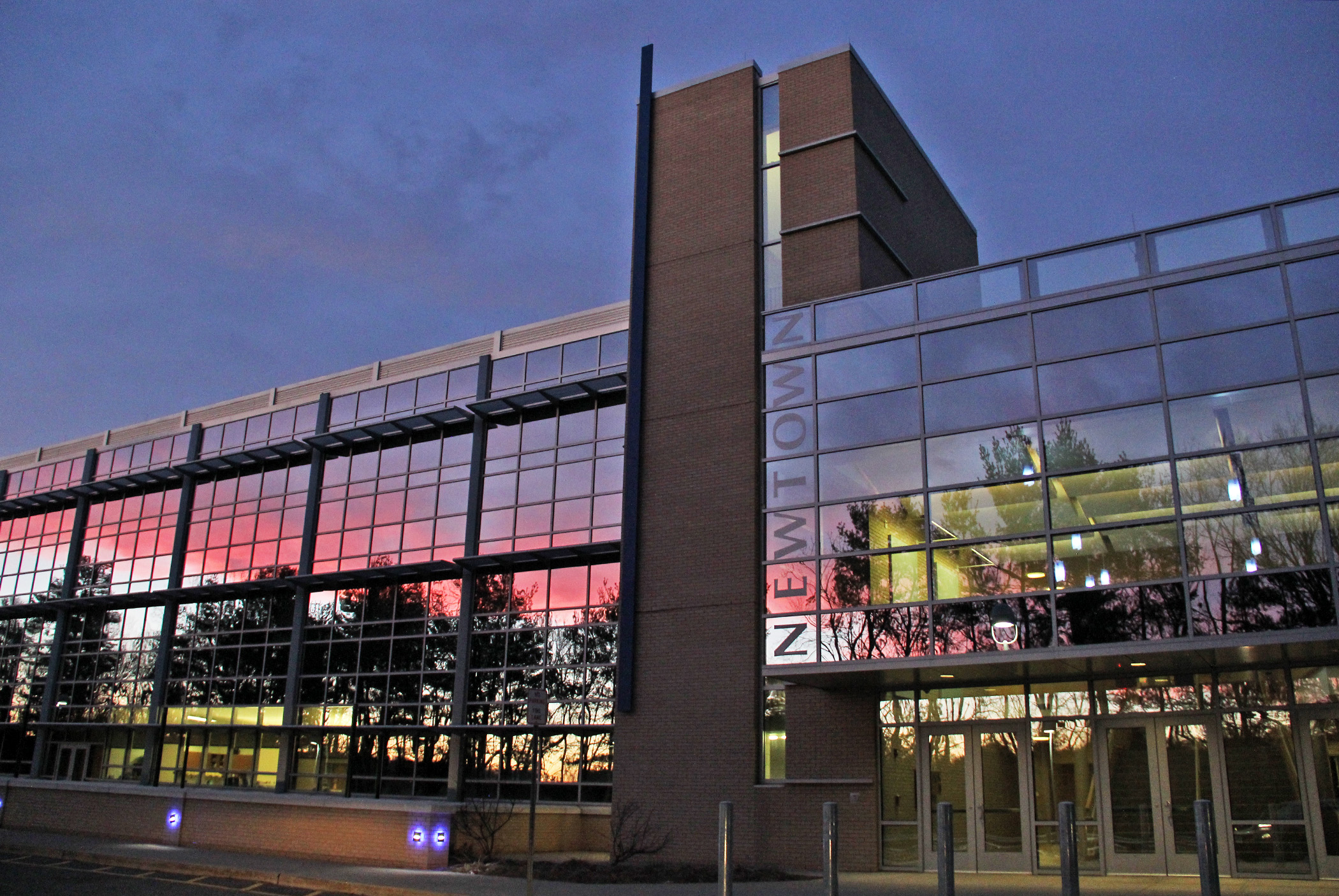
Expansion of the Newtown High School in Sandy Hook, Connecticut, which was completed in early 2012.

In 1996 the school underwent a major reconstruction, including the addition of a 88,000-square-foot (8,200 m^{2}) addition to the eastern side of the school. A new track and football field were also constructed, and extra seating was installed in the stadium. The reconstruction was complete by January 1998 and the school fully re-opened.

Renovations began in 2008 on a 77,000-square-foot (7,200 m^{2}) addition. The main building of the expansion was scheduled to open in the fall of 2010, but instead was completed in early 2012. The expansion project included adding a full new wing of three floors, including new classrooms and teachers' offices and a cafetorium (auditorium and cafeteria); renovating the gymnasium; and building a new 400-square-foot (37 m^{2}) greenhouse. In addition, the football field and track were renovated and much more parking was added. The expansion was fully completed in January 2010. With the expansion, the school's area is 376,000-square-foot (34,900 m^{2}).

=== MRSA scare ===
On October 17, 2007, two cases of MRSA-strain staph infections were reported at Newtown High School. The school put precautions in place to protect students from this potentially fatal bacterial infection.

=== Interfaith prayer service ===
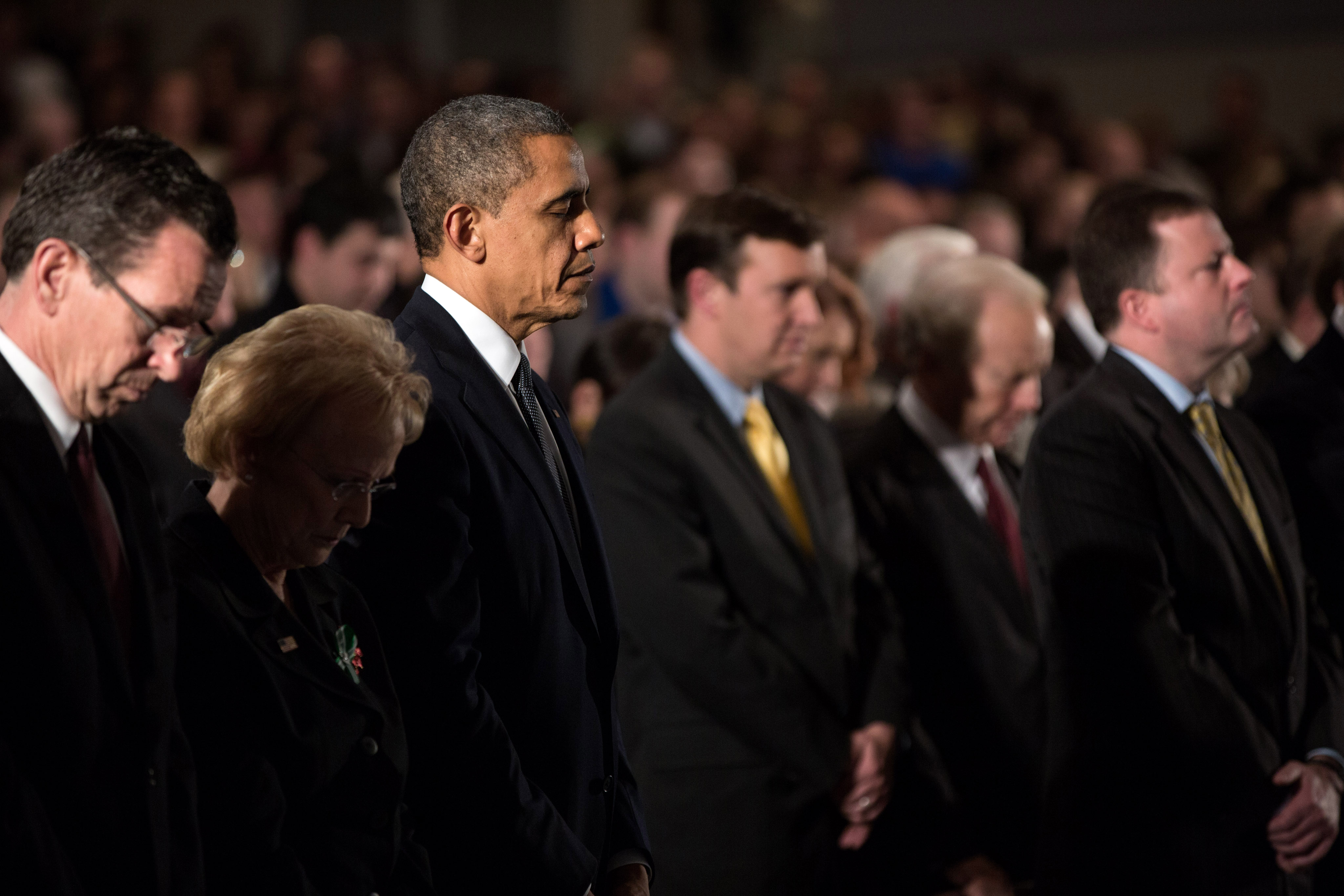
Sandy Hook interfaith vigil

On the evening of December 16, 2012, Newtown High School was the scene of a prayer service commemorating the twenty children and six adults killed by Adam Lanza during the Sandy Hook Elementary School shooting on December 14, 2012. Lanza had previously attended Newtown High School through the tenth grade.

President Barack Obama delivered a reflection at the end of the service. Connecticut Governor Dan Malloy offered some thoughts prior to the President's remarks. The entire service was broadcast nationwide on CNN.

== Extracurricular activities and athletics ==
The Newtown High School mascot and athletic emblem is the Nighthawk with blue and gold as the school colors.

=== Athletics ===
The Newtown Nighthawks compete in the Colonial Division of the South West Conference. All SWC schools are members of the Connecticut Interscholastic Athletic Conference. The Nighthawks participate in cheerleading, cross country, field hockey, football, soccer, swimming, volleyball, basketball, ice hockey, indoor track, wrestling, baseball, golf, lacrosse, softball, tennis, and track.

Until 1996, the school's teams were called "The Indians" and featured an Indian mascot. This was changed among controversy of the mascot being racist in nature. In 1996, local Connecticut students, all native American and actively involved with their culture, visited Newtown High School and explained that the pep rally and game activities—the war chants, tomahawk chants, the Indian costumes and dancing—trivialize religious customs. Representatives from other local tribes explained that mascots should not depict a race or ethnic group because it is dehumanizing. They were renamed the Newtown Nighthawks.

On December 14, 2019, the football team won the school's first state championship since 1992. Scoring in the final seconds of the game, the win made national news. Newtown was ranked second in the state at the end of the year, behind St. Joseph, who went undefeated, beating every team by a combined 44.7 points. They won on the seventh anniversary of the Sandy Hook Elementary School shooting, where several of the players on the team went for elementary school.

Wins in CIAC State Championships
Sport	Class	Year(s)
Basketball (girls)	LL	2012
Cross country (boys)	L	1987, 1988, 1989
Cross country (boys)	Open	2005
Cross country (girls)	L	1992
Cheer	L	2025, 2026
Cheer	LL	2020
Dance	Jazz Large	2016, 2018, 2020, 2023, 2024, 2025, 2026
Football	M-I	1981
Football	MM	1999
Football	LL	2019
Ice Hockey (boys)	III	2014
Soccer (boys)	LL	2004
Soccer (girls)	LL	2004, 2012
Swimming (girls)	L	1977, 2005
Volleyball (girls)	L	1996
Volleyball (girls)	LL	2011
Wrestling (boys)	LL	2014, 2015
Wrestling (boys)	Open	2015

== Marching band and color guard ==
The Newtown High School Marching Band, known as the Marching Nighthawks, is a Class III Open marching band currently under the direction of Aaron Ovsiew. In 1995, the marching band performed at the Tournament of Roses Parade in Pasadena, CA. The band won the USSBA 2006 Class IV Connecticut State Championship and placed in the top 10 in the USSBA 2007 Group IV National Championship.

In 2012 and 2013, the band was the USBands Group V Open Connecticut State Champion. In 2015, the marching band came in third place at the USBands Group V Open National Championship. In 2016, the marching band won the Group V Open Connecticut State Championship. In 2017, the marching band won the USBands Group IV Open New England States Championship and the USBands Group IV Open National Championship with the captions of "Best Overall Effect" and "Best Percussion" with their show "Dystopia". This was the school's first national championship and record score of 97.363 out of 100 points. In 2018, the marching band took third place at the USBands Group IV Open National Championship. In 2019, Newtown took third place at the USBands Group IV Open National Championship. In 2020, Newtown took 3rd place in Division II in the USBands Virtual National Championships.

== Notable alumni ==
- Caitlyn Jenner, Olympic gold medalist (1976 decathlon), reality television personality, transgender rights advocate
- Marcus Tracy, soccer player
- Jenna von Oÿ, actress
- Austin McChord, software engineer
- Ben Mason, NFL fullback, New England Patriots Practice Squad Member
- Adam Lanza, mass murderer who perpetrated the Sandy Hook Elementary School shooting
- Hannah Cruz, actress

== See also ==
- Newtown Public Schools
