= National Havoc Robot League =

American robot combat organization

The National Havoc Robot League (NHRL), formerly known as the Norwalk Havoc Robot League, is a robot combat organization headquartered in Norwalk, Connecticut. Founded in 2018 by entrepreneur Austin McChord, NHRL hosts a series of open-registration tournaments each year in which hobbyist and professional builders compete in one-on-one cage matches across three weight classes. The organization is a subsidiary of Havoc Robotics Inc., and Kelly Biderman has served as its chief executive officer since 2021.

Since its founding, NHRL has grown from a regional competition to what it describes as the world's largest robot fighting tournament, drawing thousands of competitors from nearly every continent and accumulating a reported billion organic social media views annually as of 2025. In 2026, the organization launched the NHRL Pro Tour, billed as the world's first professional robot fighting league. As of June 2026, the plan is to expand the Pro Tour into a full league-style format in the 2027 season.

== History ==
=== Founding (2018) ===
Austin McChord founded NHRL in 2018 shortly after departing Datto, the data backup company he had previously started. The inaugural event, held in December 2018, attracted only 18 competitors and operated on an informal basis with minimal broadcast infrastructure. The organization was originally named the Norwalk Havoc Robot League, reflecting its roots in Norwalk, Connecticut, before being rebranded as its reach expanded nationally and internationally.

Early events were small enough that official brackets were not always preserved, and formal livestream coverage had not yet been established.

=== Growth and relocation (2020–2021) ===
In 2020, McChord acquired a warehouse space to provide NHRL with a permanent home for its events. The COVID-19 pandemic briefly disrupted the 2020 schedule but NHRL resumed operations with health and safety mitigation in place later the same year. In 2021, McChord relocated the organization to a larger facility on Water Street in South Norwalk, which remains NHRL's headquarters. The new facility expanded the number of competition arenas, upgraded broadcast capabilities, and added a museum gallery of combat robots.

Kelly Biderman joined as CEO in 2021 and is credited with significantly expanding the organization's social media strategy, particularly on YouTube and TikTok, and overseeing the introduction of professional-level broadcast production. That same year, NHRL held its first-ever end-of-year World Championship in December, establishing the format of qualifying events followed by an annual championship that has continued since.

=== Mainstream recognition (2022–present) ===
The 2022 season saw substantial facility expansions and a sharp increase in competitor enrollment. In November 2022, McChord announced a donation of $1 million to STEM charities selected by that year's championship finalists, with an additional $1 million in grants directed toward collegiate robotics programs in 2023.

The 2023 season proved a turning point in the organization's public profile. Viewership increased by approximately 13,000 percent compared to the prior year, with the league accumulating over 400 million social media views during the year. Live events sold out, and NHRL received mainstream media coverage including appearances on NBC's Today and in the Sports Business Journal. By 2024, competitors were regularly traveling from regions including Brazil, New Zealand, and across Europe.

In August 2025, NHRL announced a broadcast partnership with Cheddar, a streaming and cable network, through which event coverage from its Prime Time series would air on Cheddar's national feed. That same year, NHRL's combined audience was reported to generate approximately a billion organic social media views annually.

On May 15, 2026, NHRL and DAZN signed a multi-year streaming deal, effective immediately ahead of the very first NHRL Pro Tour event on May 16, 2026. The current deal exists for all Pro Tour events and the Pro World Championships at the end of each season, and all NHRL World Championship Pro Tour events will be available to watch for free. Havoc Robotics CEO Kelly Biderman stated about the deal that it "is the final piece: a full media ecosystem that unlocks our flagship broadcasts at the Pro World Championships, now streaming to the biggest sports audience in the world – who are about to discover their next favorite sport.”

On June 29, 2026, Biderman made a press release looking towards the remainder of the season and into the future of NHRL. In the announcement, NHRL announces they plan to award qualifying points and wildcard slots in Pro Tour events for winners and high performers at outside events, such as the Brazilian RCX & RSM, the New Zealand Robot Rampage, and future international slots planned for the next season. Additionally, NHRL also announced an expansion of their XP point system, used to help rank newer bots, into several "minor league" events, GrowingSTEMS and Texas Robot Combat. Additionally, they announced the launch of an academy system in partnership with GrowingSTEMS, as well as expanding the availability of the Brettzone open-source broadcaster that, until this point, had only been used at NHRL. This is part of the planned decentralization of NHRL events with plans to "also explor[e] ways to empower others to run NHRL Open events in their own communities," while also "building a league finder on our [NHRL's] website, so anyone, anywhere can find their local community and get started." Additionally, the second Pro Tour event was moved from July to replace the planned September Open Qualifier, and will be located at Terminal 5, in New York City.

== Event Rules & Schedule ==
NHRL hosts multiple tournaments each year which are open to all competitors. Robots are separated into weight classes of 3, 12, and 30 pounds - the traditional Beetleweight, Hobbyweight, and Featherweight robot combat divisions. They compete in 1 versus 1 matches in enclosed arenas with double-layered polycarbonate walls and a negative pressure fire suppression system. Common weapons used by the competing robots include spinning blades, flipping devices, butane flamethrowers, and hammers. More unorthodox weaponry includes liquid nitrogen, airbags, and jet engines. Winners at each tournament receive cash prizes and are invited to a championship event held at the end of each year.

NHRL maintains an "active weapon" rule, meaning that robots need some kind of an active mechanism in addition to the robot's drive systems. This has led in the past to miniature 3D printed "steel" chairs or sand shovels used as active weapons on robots designed to control their opponents, rather than deal damage.

NHRL also features unique rules relevant to their "House Bots", designed to get combatants out of situations where they are stuck. If, during the match, a robot is able to turn off the house bot's power switch, located on the rear of the robot, that driver wins $1000 on the spot. Initially, it also automatically won the fight for that driver, too, but that subsection was removed following a controversy in 2021.

As of 2026, this schedule has shifted to a planned 9 Open Qualifying events a year, three championship seeding Pro Tour events, and the December World Championships.

== Champion History ==
All champion data gathered from NHRL's official statistics.

Austin McChord founded NHRL shortly after leaving Datto in 2018. 18 competitors participated in the first event later that year. In 2021, McChord moved the organization to its current headquarters in South Norwalk, along Water St. The facility also hosts a museum collection of past combat robots from multiple weight classes.

=== 2018/19 Season ===
Many brackets from this time are either no longer available or not public, due to the informal nature of many of the earlier events. Many of these early events did not have official long-form broadcast livestreams, however the fight records are still available via NRHL's YouTube.

2018/19 3-lb Competitions
Date (Event Name)	3-lb Champion	# of competitors	Bracket
December 2018	Silent Spring	Unknown (presumed <25)	Lost
January 2019	Squishy	Unknown (presumed <25)	Lost
March 2019	Mondo Bizarro	Unknown (presumed <25)	Lost
May 2019	Silent Spring (2)	Unknown (presumed <25)	Lost
August 2019	Tiny Huge	Unknown (presumed <25)	Lost
September 2019 (Fall Fury 2019)	Silent Spring (3)	26	
November 2019 (Turkey Tumble)	Narsil	21	

2018/19 12-lb Sportsman Competitions

The sportsman events were much smaller, more controlled events, that were largely exhibition matches, rather than anything competitive. As such, data for many sportsman events appears in very few official records.

2018/19 12-lb Sportsman Competitions
Date (Event Name)	Sportsman Champion	# of competitors	Bracket
March 2019	Grudge Matches Only (No Bracket Run)	2	N/A
September 2019 (Fall Fury)	Tuskin' Raider	8	

=== 2020 Season ===
For the first time, NHRL declares an end-of-year championship, usually held in December each year moving forward (with one exception). This causes the competitions earlier in the year to become qualifying events for that end-of-year championship. As with everything else in the year 2020, the season suffered mightily from the effects of the COVID-19 pandemic, forcing the cancellation or rescheduling of multiple events.

NHRL also hosts its (as of the 2025 season) only back-to-back competition days (a full-weekend competition would occur in future seasons, but never two different competitions on two consecutive days) as a result of the pandemic, and Shreddit Bro dominates, winning both competitions.

Droopy becomes the first World Champion, beating out 18 other robots to take home the initial title, in its first ever event win at NHRL.

2020 3-lb Competitions
Date (Event Name)	3-lb Champion	# of competitors	Bracket
January 2020	Silent Spring (4)	27	
July 18, 2020	Shreddit Bro	Unknown (likely <20)	Lost
July 19, 2020	Shreddit Bro (2)	27	
September 2020	Billy	23	
November 2020	Lynx	49	
December 2020 (NHRL 2020 Finals)	Droopy	19	

2020 12-lb Sportsman Event

There was only one event with recorded Sportsman activity in 2020, the July 18, 2020 event. However, due to there being only 3 competitors, no bracket was made nor champion crowned.

=== 2021 Season ===
NHRL moves into the new, larger Water St. facility, and upgrades their facilities from 1 box, designed for 3-lb and 12-lb Sportsman fights up to 3 boxes - one new larger box for Full-Combat 12- and 30-lb robot fights, and 2 for 3-lb and 12-lb Sportsman fights.

Lynx became the first 3-lb robot to have multiple event championships and a World title, winning two events to finish the year. Project LiftOff also becomes the first Melty-Brain, named due to the complex electronics and sensors, to win an NHRL event.

2021 3-lb Competitions
Date (Event Name)	3-lb Champion	# of competitors	Bracket
Feb 6, 2021	Shreddit Bro (3)	34	
March 20, 2021	Polywog	55	
May 15, 2021	Silent Spring (5)	67	
July 24-25, 2021	Silent X	86	
September 18, 2021	Project LiftOff	58	
November 13, 2021	Lynx (2)	90	
December 2021 (2021 NHRL World Championships)	Lynx (3)	27	

Tuskin' Raider caps the Sportsman calendar by becoming the first, and only, robot to win multiple official Sportsman brackets.

2021 12-lb Sportsman Competitions
Date (Event Name)	12-lb Sportsman Champion	# of competitors	Bracket
February 6, 2021	P12	4	
July 24, 2021	RAM PLAN	4	
November 13, 2021	Tuskin' Raider (2)	5	

Hot Leaf Juice (later stylized as HotLeafJuice) dominates the back half of the 2021 12-lb schedule, winning three of the final four events, including the World Championship. Caulk also makes history as the first multi-bot to win an NHRL event as a collection of 3-lb robots punching above their weight class in the 12-lb division.

2021 12-lb Full Combat Competitions
Date (Event Name)	12-lb Champion	# of competitors	Bracket
Feb 6, 2021	Kitten Mittens	4	
March 20, 2021	Caulk	Unknown (likely <10)	Unavailable
May 15, 2021	Ugee	10	
July 24-25, 2021	Hot Leaf Juice	16	
September 18, 2021	Pramheda	7	
November 13, 2021	Hot Leaf Juice (2)	9	
December 2021 (2021 NHRL World Championships)	Hot Leaf Juice (3)	22	

MegatRON wins the first and last competitions of the year, both at debut of the 30-lb competition in February and at the debut of the professional broadcasts with the World Championships. The 30-lb division established itself as a division with heavy parity between the robots, without a clear top-ranked robot at NHRL during the 2021 season.

2021 30-lb Full Combat Competitions
Date (Event Name)	30-lb Champion	# of competitors	Bracket
Feb 6, 2021	MegatRON	7	
March 20, 2021	Stop Hitting Yourself	7	
May 15, 2021	Other Disko	8	
July 24-25, 2021	Yahoo	5	
September 18, 2021	Emulsifier	6	
November 13, 2021	Tryhard	12	
December 2021 (2021 NHRL World Championships)	MegatRON (2)	19	

=== 2022 Season ===
2022 saw facility expansions across the board, ranging from pit expansions to extra boxes to accommodate even more robots, as the competition exploded in popularity this year, especially in the 3-lb division. 2022 also sees the opening of the bot museum, a collection of heavyweight robots primarily from builders operating at NHRL and competing at the larger BattleBots competition.

This also marks the last year with any kind of substantial Sportsman combat, as many competitors moved towards the more heavy-hitting Full Combat division instead. The facility also rapidly grows in size, from 3 boxes to a total of 6 for the November event.

November 12, 2022, marks what is at the time the largest event ever held at NHRL, with a then-record 134 robots competing over the course of the day.

In November 2022, McChord announced that he would donate $1 million to STEM charities chosen by that year's finalists in the championship tournament. Keeping with that tradition, an additional $1 million of grants were made to collegiate robotics teams in 2023.

In the 3-lb division, Lynx takes two more titles, including a defense of their World Championship title. Crashfest becomes the first robot to win an NHRL event without a traditional weapon, instead using a plastic shovel as a "thwacker" [sic], technically allowed as an active weapon under NHRL rules, while operating in practice as a control bot. It becomes the very first non-spinner robot to win an event, capturing the inaugural New Bots event title and quickly becoming a fan favorite.

2022 3-lb Champions
Date (Event Name)	3-lb Champion	# of competitors	Bracket
March 26, 2022	Silent Spring (6)	79	
April 23, 2022	Lynx (4)	58	
May 14, 2022 (New Bots '22)	Crashfest	50	
July 16-17, 2022	Eruption	77	
September 17, 2022	Malice	86	
November 12, 2022	Fully Defined	99	
December 17, 2022 (2022 World Championships)	Lynx (5)	24	

The 12-lb division sees the rise of bot constructor and driver Jamison Go in NHRL, the architect of Pramheda. Go is also known for his robots like the 250-lb heavyweight Sawblaze on BattleBots. Touro Jr. becomes the first non-American bot to win a title in July, with its team hailing from Rio de Janeiro, Brazil; Team riobotz is also known for their 250lb offering of Minotaur. Ugee won its first title at the end of the year to be crowned the NHRL World Champion in the 12-lb division.

2022 12-lb Champions
Date (Event Name)	12-lb Champion	# of competitors	Bracket
March 26, 2022	Pramheda (2)	15	
April 23, 2022	Krunk	10	
May 14, 2022 (New Bots '22)	YOB GNOL	16	
July 16-17, 2022	Touro Jr	20	
September 17, 2022	Saiko!	20	
November 12, 2022	YOB GNOL (2)	20	
December 17, 2022 (2022 World Championships)	Ugee (2)	23	

The 30-lb division remained extremely competitive through the 2022 season. During the now-traditional New Bots event, taking place in May 2022, NHRL's tallest robot debuts; named Huge, it goes on to win the bracket at that event. Like Jamison Go, Huge is better known for its 250-lb version competing on Battlebots, where it's been a competitor since 2018. Emulsifier wins both of the last two events of the year to be crowned the second 30-lb NHRL World Champion.

2022 30-lb Champions
Date (Event Name)	30-lb Champion	# of competitors	Bracket
March 26, 2022	Marathon	14	
April 23, 2022	Litter Box	13	
May 14, 2022 (New Bots '22)	Huge	11	
July 16-17, 2022	Knock Off White	6	
September 17, 2022	Yahoo (2)	8	
November 12, 2022	Emulsifier (2)	12	
December 17, 2022 (2022 World Championships)	Emulsifier (3)	25	

=== 2023 Season ===
2023 saw at the start of a new tournament format designed to speed up tournaments while allowing fields to remain, for the time being, uncapped. This season saw far more robots across the board, with well over 100 in every non-championship event. Additionally, this also saw the New Bots event move to its now-traditional January event date. Finally, the 2023 season closed not with the World Championships, moved to November this season, but instead with the one-off, three-day Havoc All-Stars Event, bringing community members and technology YouTubers together for the final event of the year.

The "May the Bots Be With You" event saw the robot Droopy win its first NHRL competition since the 2020 World Championships, emerging victorious from a record total of 155 registrants in the 3-lb division. Silent Spring remained a threat throughout the season, winning its league-leading seventh title during the June event. Supreme Ruler (stylized as Supreme 📏) becomes the first lifter bot to win an NHRL title in August. Booty Brigade takes home the 2023 Championship, a combined effort from Calvin Iba, a Northrop Grumman engineer who worked on the James Webb Space Telescope and the Battlebot MadCatter, and Tommy Wong, one of the engineers from past champions Droopy and Caulk, complete with both robots of the duo sporting butts. During the All-Stars event in December, Dutch Oven becomes the first flamethrower robot to win an NHRL event.

2023 3-lb Champions
Date (Event Name)	3-lb Champion	# of competitors	Bracket
January 28, 2023 (New Year. New Bots.)	Púca	101	
March 18, 2023 (March of the Bots)	Chubby Unicorn	131	
May 6, 2023 (May the Bots Be With You)	Droopy (2)	155	
June 24-25, 2023 (Sparky's Circus)	Silent Spring (7)	139	
August 12, 2023 (Hot Bot Summer)	Supreme Ruler	140	
September 30, 2023 (The Final Botdown)	Monkfish	149	
November 11, 2023 (2023 World Championships)	Booty Brigade	24	
December 5-7, 2023 (Havoc All-Stars)	Dutch Oven	12	

In the June event, Superscope has one of the most unusual bracket runs of any robot - of its seven NHRL wins, six come in this single event as it storms past all competition to win the event. Maximizer is the only robot to win multiple 12-lb competitions this NHRL season, taking home the title both in May and August. Full Court, an unusually long lifter-style robot, wins the 2023 12-lb NHRL World Champion title in a judge's decision over Saiko! in the November finals, building on the momentum built by Supreme 📏 in August.

2023 12-lb Champions
Date (Event Name)	12-lb Champion	# of competitors	Bracket
January 28, 2023 (New Year. New Bots.)	Torrential	19	
March 18, 2023 (March of the Bots)	Saiko! (2)	23	
May 6, 2023 (May the Bots Be With You)	Maximizer	25	
June 24-25, 2023 (Sparky's Circus)	Superscope	32	
August 12, 2023 (Hot Bot Summer)	Maximizer (2)	26	
September 30, 2023 (The Final Botdown)	Xupa-Cabra	37	
November 11, 2023 (2023 World Championships)	Full Court	24	
December 5-7, 2023 (Havoc All-Stars)	Cthulu	12	

During May and June, Kablooey Tango becomes the first 30-lb robot to win consecutive regular-season competitions. Emulsifier becomes the first NHRL 30-lb robot to win multiple World Championships, taking its second consecutive World Champion title in its only event win of the season.

2023 30-lb Champions
Date (Event Name)	30-lb Champion	# of competitors	Bracket
January 28, 2023 (New Year. New Bots.)	EVA	10	
March 18, 2023 (March of the Bots)	MegatRON (3)	14	
May 6, 2023 (May the Bots Be With You)	Kablooey Tango	18	
June 24-25, 2023 (Sparky's Circus)	Kablooey Tango (2)	21	
August 12, 2023 (Hot Bot Summer)	Vorion	10	
September 30, 2023 (The Final Botdown)	Red Storm	24	
November 11, 2023 (2023 World Championships)	Emulsifier (4) [2nd World Championship]	23	
December 5-7, 2023 (Havoc All-Stars)	Vorion (2)	12	

=== 2024 Season ===
The 2024 season saw the introduction of the bot cap, limiting field sizes for the regular-season events for the first time in NHRL history. The limits set at the beginning of the 2024 season were 96 robots in the 3lb division, and 40 combined slots for 12lb and 30lb bots, with one weight class capped at 24 and the other at 16, with the higher number going to whichever division has more interest. Additionally, the qualification round process, introduced in the 2023 season, was drastically simplified: now a three-round process, each robot needed to win twice (2-0 or 2-1) to qualify for the main bracket. This was the last year of the New Bots event, as it would be returned to a standard Open competition in 2025. 2024 also saw the first NHRL event to take place outside of Norwalk, Connecticut, with a 3-lb event held in Rochester, New York, at RIT in late March.

2024 also saw a team-based event put on in collaboration with ESPN, broadcast on August 1 as a part of ESPN2's The Ocho broadcast. The overall team champion of the event was the Dream Team, consisting of 3-lb Lynx, 12-lb Saiko!, and 30-lb Emulsifier (stylized as Mulsie for this event) after having won two of the three brackets outright.

2024 3-lb Champions
Date	3-lb Champion	# of competitors	Bracket
January 20, 2024 (New Bots 2024)	Scurryfest	96	
March 2nd, 2024	Eruption (2)	96	
March 25, 2024 (in Rochester, NY)	Caldera	36	
April 20, 2024	Clyde	96	
June 1, 2024 (Teams Event)	Beetlejuice	16	
June 22, 2024	WarHard	96	
September 14, 2024	Knuckle Sandwich	96	
October 26, 2024	TurboFIEND	96	
December 7, 2024 (2024 World Championships)	Repeater	25	

SLAM PLAN came into its own at the end of the season, winning both the October qualifier and December World Championships, becoming builder Brendan Steele's first World Champion.

2024 12-lb Champions
Date	12-lb Champion	# of competitors	Bracket
January 20, 2024 (New Bots 2024)	Questionable Choices	24	
March 2nd, 2024	Pramheda (3)	24	
April 20, 2024	Amphisbaena	24	
June 1, 2024 (Teams Event)	Saiko! (3)	16	
June 22, 2024	Honey-fied	24	
September 14, 2024	Buzzzz-Kill	24	
October 26, 2024	SLAM PLAN	24	
December 7, 2024 (2024 World Championships)	SLAM PLAN (2)	24	

MegatRON took home their second World Championship in December. As is tradition in the 30-lb division, no single robot won multiple open competitions in the season, with Emulsifier's second win coming as a part of the closed Teams event in June.

2024 30-lb Champions
Date	30-lb Champion	# of competitors	Bracket
January 20, 2024 (New Bots 2024)	Mocassin	16	
March 2nd, 2024	Emulsifier (5)	16	
April 20, 2024	Chonkiv	16	
June 1, 2024 (Teams Event)	Emulsifier (6)	16	
June 22, 2024	Phenomenon	16	
September 14, 2024	Yahoo (3)	16	
October 26, 2024	ARES	16	
December 7, 2024 (2024 World Championships)	MegatRON (4) [2nd World Championship]	20	

=== 2025 Season ===
Silent Spring wins its record eighth event in February, which as of April 2026 is a mark that still stands as the most events won by a single robot. Pinevictus wins the 2025 World Championship in December after having debuted four years prior.

2025 3-lb Champions
Date	3-lb Champion	# of competitors	Bracket
February 1, 2025	Silent Spring (8)	88	
March 1, 2025	IMPAKT	96	
April 5, 2025	Chainsaw Kitty	96	
May 3, 2025	Jelly Baby	96	
June 7, 2025	Caldera (2)	96	
October 4, 2025	Jelly Baby (2)	96	
November 1, 2025	Sir Slicey	96	
December 6, 2025 (2025 World Championships)	Pinevictus	28	

Maximizer takes home its first event win since winning two in the 2023 season during the October open qualifier. Pramheda bookends the season with wins,

2025 12-lb Champions
Date	12-lb Champion	# of competitors	Bracket
February 1, 2025	Pramheda (4)	16	
March 1, 2025	Saiko!	20	
April 5, 2025	Cherri	30	
May 3, 2025	Ugee (3)	28	
June 7, 2025	Full Court (2)	32	
October 4, 2025	Maximizer (3)	32	
November 1, 2025	Buzzzz-Kill (2)	29	
December 6, 2025 (2025 World Championships)	Pramheda (5)	27	

ARES wins another October event, marking the second year in a row the robot wins in that month's qualifier. KaZaA Lite wins two events this year, the March open qualifier and the December World Championship. KaZaA Lite is the third robot to win multiple 30-lb competitions at NHRL within the same season, following Emulsifier and Kablooey Tango.

2025 30-lb Champions
Date	30-lb Champion	# of competitors	Bracket
February 1, 2025	Chonkiv (2)	11	
March 1, 2025	KaZaA Lite	10	
April 5, 2025	Anxietii	10	
May 3, 2025	Waddles!	13	
June 7, 2025	Red Storm (2)	16	
October 4, 2025	ARES (2)	16	
November 1, 2025	Jubileu	19	
December 6, 2025 (2025 World Championships)	KaZaA Lite (2)	28	

=== 2026 Season ===
This is the ongoing NHRL season. This season marks a change in the qualification process for the World Championship at the end of the season. In addition to the originally-planned eight (now down to seven following a cancellation) open qualifiers, there is an intermediate step: three competitions known as the NHRL Pro Tour, which are exclusive to competitors who reach the quarterfinal stage of any of the preceding Open Qualifier rounds. While still necessary to reach the top 4 non-qualified robots in any event to reach the World Championship, the placement of a robot at the Pro Tour event(s) they attend will affect their seeding at the season-ending championship.

There are also plans to host events outside of Norwalk, similarly to the 3-lb event held in Rochester in 2024.

In late April, it was announced that the July open qualifier event, slated to be Round 6, would instead be cancelled in favor of amplifying the July Pro Tour event. Ahead of the May Pro Tour event, NHRL announced a free streaming deal with DAZN, available internationally, for Pro Tour & World Championship events.

During the break after the June Open Qualifier, it was announced that the September Open Qualifier would also be cancelled, and the second Pro Tour event would be moved to New York City in the September time slot.

Clyde dominated the competition in May's Open Qualifier, igniting robots across its path and melting its last two opponents to win its first Golden Dumpster in two years. Colossus took the 3lb's first Pro Tour bracket after puncturing its opponent's battery to win the final match. In June, driver Julian Papasian turned "heel", taking on the moniker "Evil Julian" with his robot Turbofiend, bringing it all the way to the final match against hammer-saw robot Termination Shock from Worcester Polytechnic Institute, where it was incapacitated.

2026 3-lb Champions
Date	Event	3-lb Champion	# of competitors	Bracket
February 7, 2026	Qualifier Round 1	The Wall PT2	72	
March 7, 2026	Qualifier Round 2	Showtime!	80	
April 4, 2026	Qualifier Round 3	Blunder	80	
May 2, 2026	Qualifier Round 4	Clyde (2)	80	
May 16, 2026	Pro Tour Round 1	Colossus	20	
June 6, 2026	Qualifier Round 5	Termination Shock	80	NHRL June 2026 Open 3lb
September 12, 2026	Pro Tour Round 2 (NYC)	TBD	TBD	
October 3, 2026	Qualifier Round 6	TBD	TBD	
November 7, 2026	Pro Tour Round 3	TBD	TBD	
December 5, 2026	2026 World Championships	TBD	TBD	

Pyre becomes possibly the most unlikely champion in NHRL's history at the May Open Qualifier, winning the tournament in its first-ever appearance.

2026 12-lb Champions
Date	Event	12-lb Champion	# of competitors	Bracket
February 7, 2026	Qualifier Round 1	Buzzzz-Kill (3)	14	
March 7, 2026	Qualifier Round 2	Robo-Cat	18	
April 4, 2026	Qualifier Round 3	Xenomorph	32	
May 2, 2026	Qualifier Round 4	Pyre	25	
May 16, 2026	Pro Tour Round 1	Robo-Cat (2)	16	
June 6, 2026	Qualifier Round 5	Buzzzz-Kill (4)	27	NHRL June 2026 Open 12lb
September 12, 2026	Pro Tour Round 2 (NYC)	TBD	TBD	
October 3, 2026	Qualifier Round 6	TBD	TBD	
November 7, 2026	Pro Tour Round 3	TBD	TBD	
December 5, 2026	2026 World Championships	TBD	TBD	

Driver Corey Neason won his first Golden Dumpster in the April event after six years of competing at NHRL with Synthesis 30 after his opponent's weapon shattered in the 30-lb final. In May's open qualifier, Emulsifier won its weight class-leading seventh Golden Dumpster. Twin flamethrower bots KaZaA Lite taking home two event wins, including the first Pro Tour event and the larger flamethrower KaZaA Eins taking home the June Open Qualifier.

2026 30-lb Champions
Date	Event	30-lb Champion	# of competitors	Bracket
February 7, 2026	Qualifier Round 1	KaZaA Lite (3)	8	
March 7, 2026	Qualifier Round 2	MegatRON (5)	11	
April 4, 2026	Qualifier Round 3	Synthesis 30	13	
May 2, 2026	Qualifier Round 4	Emulsifier (7)	10	
May 16, 2026	Pro Tour Round 1	KaZaA Lite (4)	12	
June 6, 2026	Qualifier Round 5	KaZaA Eins	15	NHRL June 2026 Open 30lb
September 12, 2026	Pro Tour Round 2 (NYC)	TBD	TBD	
October 3, 2026	Qualifier Round 6	TBD	TBD	
November 7, 2026	Pro Tour Round 3	TBD	TBD	
December 5, 2026	2026 World Championships	TBD	TBD	
