= Kaseya =

American software company based in Miami, Florida

Kaseya Limited
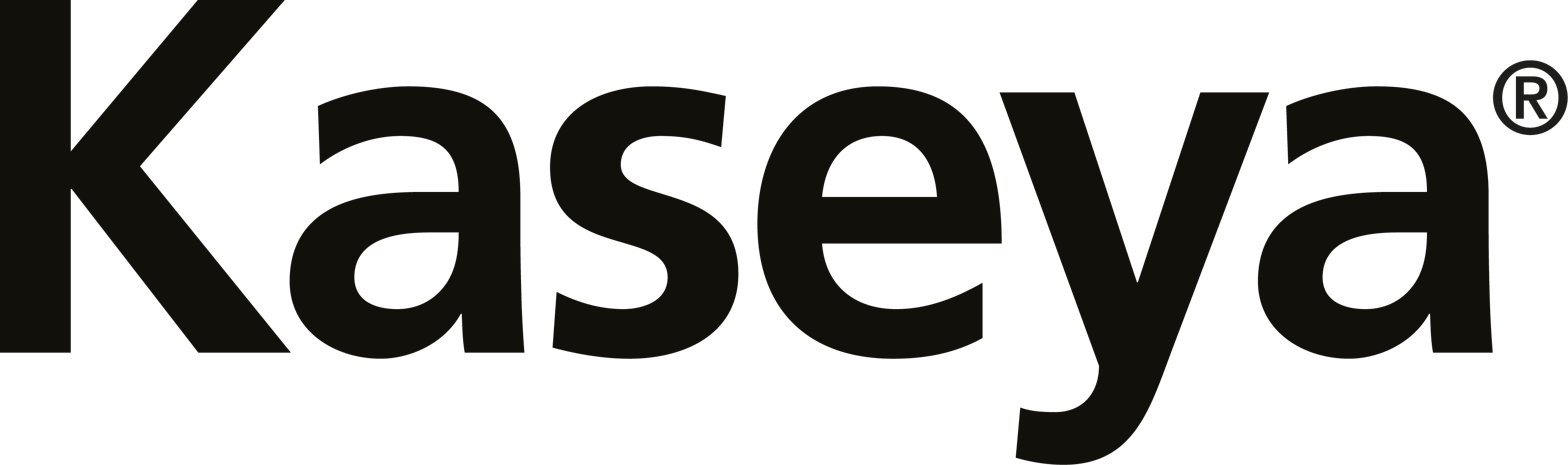
- Type: Private
- Industry: Information technology
- Founded: 2001; 25 years ago
- Founder: Mark Sutherland; Paul Wong
- Headquarters: Miami, Florida
- Products: Network monitoring System monitoring
- Revenue: ▲US$1.5 billion (2025)
- Owner: Insight Partners (majority owner)
- Number of employees: 4,000
- Website: www.kaseya.com

Kaseya Limited (/kəˈseɪ.ə/ kə-SAY-ə) (commonly known as Kaseya) is an information technology company headquartered in Miami. Kaseya develops software for network monitoring, system monitoring, and other information technology applications, selling primarily to managed service providers (MSPs) and internal IT departments. MSPs, which provide outsourced IT services to small and medium businesses, use Kaseya products in their companies and resell the products to their customers. Kaseya is majority-owned by private equity firm Insight Partners and owns the naming rights to the Kaseya Center. It was founded in 2000. The Kaseya VSA ransomware attack caused downtime for some Kaseya customers and downstream organizations in July 2021.

== History ==
=== 2000–2012: Formation and early growth ===
Kaseya was founded in 2000 in California by Mark Sutherland and Paul Wong, who previously worked together on a project for the National Security Agency. In 2003, Gerald Blackie joined the company as its CEO. The company's early products included Kaseya Virtual System Administrator (VSA), a remote monitoring and management web application.

=== 2013–2017: Investment and leadership changes ===
In June 2013, Insight Partners acquired control of the company and Yogesh Gupta became CEO. In July 2015, Fred Voccola succeeded Gupta as CEO of the company.

In 2017, Kaseya raised almost $45 million in a private equity round. This included €19 million from the Ireland Strategic Investment Fund; Kaseya announced hirings of up to 130 employees in its Dublin office.

=== 2018–2026: Funding and transitions ===
In 2018, the company moved its US headquarters from Boston to Brickell, Miami, with an agreement to receive tax credits from the county for creating new jobs. Also in 2018, Kaseya acquired Unitrends, Spanning Cloud Apps, RapidFire Tools Inc., and IT Glue.

A funding round in 2019, with Insight Partners and TPG as lead investors, raised $500 million at a valuation of $1.75 billion.

In July 2021, at that time of the Kaseya VSA ransomware attack, it had about 36,000 customers (see Kaseya § Security issues).

In 2022, Kaseya acquired a major competitor, Datto, in a $6.2 billion transaction. The deal was led by Insight Partners with investment from TPG, Temasek, and Sixth Street Partners. Funding for the transaction included over $3 billion in loans from private credit firms. The acquisition led to conflicts in company culture and billing issues, although the company said that these were resolved by 2023.

In April 2023, the company acquired the naming rights to the Kaseya Center in a 17-year, $117.4 million agreement.

The company was valued at about $12 billion at that time. The Heat additionally have a deal with Kaseya to make the company its official IT solutions partner.

Kaseya and Miami-Dade County arranged in 2023 for up to $4.6 million in subsidies for the company if it added 3,400 jobs locally over the next three years. It had about 4,500 employees worldwide at the time, including 800 in Miami. The company terminated about 150 Miami-based employees in 2024 for performance reasons. The company laid off about 200 employees in October 2025 and some more in December 2025, and it said it continues to hire for other roles. It also laid off about 250 employees in January 2026. As of January 2026, the company website said it had about 5,000 total employees.

In January 2025, Fred Voccola resigned as CEO and became Kaseya's vice chairman. Rania Succar was named CEO in June 2025.

== Products and services ==
Kaseya sells products and services to managed service providers (MSPs) and company IT departments, with the goal of helping MSPs increase revenue and efficiency.

Kaseya has two remote monitoring and management (RMM) products for IT technicians to remotely monitor, manage, and patch devices, along with related products for managing IT environments. Kaseya VSA supports desktops, laptops, and servers on Windows, macOS, and Linux, available both as a SaaS product and for on-premise installation. Kaseya also provides Datto RMM as a second remote monitoring and management product. IT Glue, acquired by Kaseya in 2018, is an IT documentation platform.

Kaseya provides several standalone products for IT risk management and information security management. It has backup and disaster recovery products, under both the Kaseya and Datto brands, to help businesses recover data and restore operations after outages or cyberattacks. Kaseya's cybersecurity products include endpoint detection and response services, including for reducing risks of phishing and ransomware. It also sells services for network security scanning, automated network penetration testing, and managing compliance with information security standards.

Kaseya also sells products for managing network performance and reliability, including network switches, wireless access points, network monitoring tools, power distribution units, secure access service edge (SASE), and network operations center services.

In April 2024, Kaseya released Kaseya 365, a service for MSPs that bundles many of its services into a per-endpoint monthly subscription, including remote monitoring, endpoint security, and backup. In the product announcement, CEO Voccola said "On average, an MSP powered by Kaseya 365 can expect to increase the profit per endpoint upwards of $10." In October 2024 the company added Kaseya 365 User, intended to help MSPs protect customers against threats to user identity and security.

Along with tools for MSPs to resell to their clients, Kaseya offers tools for internal business operations for MSPs, including professional services automation platforms.

In 2025, Kaseya released 365 Ops, a subscription service with AI and automation features for MSP operations.

== Competitors ==
Kaseya's competitors include other companies with products for MSPs, such as ConnectWise, N-able (formerly part of SolarWinds), NinjaOne, Atera, Syncro, and SuperOps.ai. Related companies include managed detection and response firms such as Huntress, Blackpoint Cyber, Trend Micro, eSentire, and Rapid7.

== Security issues ==
Kaseya disclosed in 2014 that attackers had used a vulnerability in its VSA software to deploy cryptojacking malware. The company's remote tool was infiltrated in 2018, and hackers were again able to commandeer affected computers to mine cryptocurrency.

In 2015, Kaseya fixed a directory traversal vulnerability in their remote access tool. The same bug was present in a no-longer-used part of the company's website until July 2021, when the company was notified by an independent security researcher.

In July 2021, a supply chain ransomware attack on Kaseya VSA software, perpetrated by REvil, affected Kaseya's customers. The attack on July 2, 2021 used unpatched vulnerabilities that the Dutch Institute for Vulnerability Disclosure (DVID) had reported to Kaseya in April 2021; Kaseya had released patches to fix four of the seven vulnerabilities. Kaseya reported downtime for about 60 of its customers and up to 1,500 downstream businesses. Kaseya started restoration on July 23, 2021, using a decryption key provided by a "trusted third party".

Former employees said that they had raised concerns about company security practices between 2017 and 2020, and that there had been smaller ransomware attacks involving VSA in 2018 and 2019. Also in July 2021, DVID reported three vulnerabilities in Kaseya's Unitrends backup service to Kaseya and government Computer Emergency Response Teams (CERTs); one CERT inadvertently disclosed the issue to the public before Kaseya fully patched it.

In July 2025, Galactic Advisors identified two security vulnerabilities in Kaseya Network Detective and coordinated with Kaseya to resolve the issues.

In September 2025, Kaseya's chief information security officer, who was hired a few months after the July 2021 incident, said he had significantly improved the company's security program.

== Customer complaints ==
Kaseya faced backlash in 2022, with customers unhappy with the company's end user license agreement (EULA), which had been in effect since November 2020. The EULA auto-renewed contracts for "additional Terms equal to the greater of the expiring Term length or three (3) years." In response to customer feedback, Kaseya modified the EULA so that all contracts subject to automatic renewal renewed for the same duration as the prior agreement. Kaseya also gave customers the ability to cancel an agreement any time up to 30 days before its expiration. Additionally, Kaseya implemented a policy to send multiple renewal notifications 90 days in advance.

In 2025, Kaseya announced it was phasing out high watermark billing, a pricing model that charges MSPs based on the highest usage level reached during a billing cycle. The phase out began with three Kaseya products: SaaS Protect, Spanning, and Azure Backup. It was to be expanded over time.
