= Victor Gevers =

Dutch security hacker

Victor Gevers is a Dutch security hacker.

== Career ==
He has been hacking since 1998 and is running the GDI Foundation.

In 2019 he discovered a large data breach of the Chinese surveillance company SenseNets.

He is known for hacking the Twitter account of U.S. President Donald Trump. He was not convicted for it.
