= Datto (company) =

American cybersecurity and data backup company

Datto, Inc.
- Type: Division
- Industry: Software
- Founded: 2007; 19 years ago in Norwalk, Connecticut, U.S.
- Founder: Austin McChord
- Defunct: June 23, 2022; 4 years ago (as a company)
- Fate: Acquired by Kaseya
- Headquarters: Norwalk, Connecticut, U.S.
- Areas served: Worldwide
- Products: Disaster Recovery and Business Continuity (BCDR); Remote Monitoring and Management (RMM); Professional Services Automation (PSA); Networking; Software as a Service (SaaS)
- Revenue: ▲$618 million (2021)
- Net income: ▲$51 million (2021)
- Total assets: ▲$1.962 billion (2021)
- Total equity: ▲$1.811 billion (2021)
- Number of employees: 2,089 (December 2021)
- Parent: Kaseya
- Website: datto.com

Datto, Inc. is an American cybersecurity and data backup company. In 2017, it was acquired by Vista Equity Partners. In 2022, it became a subsidiary of Kaseya.

Datto builds hardware and software for both data backup and recovery purposes. Datto RMM is a cloud-based remote monitoring and management platform that allows managed services providers to manage IT infrastructure with automation tools like networking monitoring, patch management, remote control and mass script deployment. Datto RMM includes policy-based Windows and third-party software patching where partners have the option to store patch updates on the local area network (LAN) to reduce bandwidth utilization or download them directly from Microsoft.

== History ==
=== Founding and early growth ===
Datto was founded in 2007 in Norwalk, Connecticut, by software programmer Austin McChord, who initially built and marketed his own hand-made data backup devices. After securing his first customers in 2008, McChord built a system that allowed for data synchronization between two computers, followed by a version of Zenith InfoTech that ran on Linux. The company reached $70,000 in monthly sales by the end of 2009. When a 2010 product release caused older systems to crash, Datto designed a replacement from scratch and released it months later as SIRIS, offered to customers as a free upgrade. Revenue grew quickly thereafter, rising from $9 million in 2011 to $25 million the following year.

=== Expansion and venture funding ===
Datto began expanding internationally in July 2013 with the acquisition of its UK distributor, Paradeon Technologies. That September, the company raised $25 million in its first round of venture capital financing, led by General Catalyst Partners, while continuing to sell its products primarily through managed service providers. By this point Datto was focused on small and mid-size businesses, counting Susan G. Komen for the Cure and several NFL teams among its clients. The company broadened its backup offerings in 2014 by purchasing Backupify, a cloud-to-cloud backup company whose focus on backing up server data complemented Datto's emphasis on local and private clouds.

A $75 million Series B round, led mostly by Technology Crossover Ventures, followed in November 2015 and helped make Datto Connecticut's first "unicorn" company. Around the same time the company opened a Sydney office to enter the Australian and New Zealand markets, and its workforce had grown to 550 employees. Datto continued to develop its disaster-recovery products, releasing SIRIS 3 x 1—described as the first all-flash BCDR product with ransomware detection—in June 2016 and the SIRIS 3 data protection platform that October.

European expansion accelerated in mid-2016, when Datto opened its EMEA headquarters in Reading, established data centers in Iceland and Germany, and signed distribution deals in Spain and Greece; a further office opened in Amsterdam in September 2017 to serve the Benelux regions. The company also acquired the networking firm Open Mesh in January 2017. Its headcount continued to climb, reaching 700 employees by January 2017 and 883 by that October, 434 of them in Norwalk.

=== Acquisitions and public offering ===
In late 2017, Vista Equity Partners acquired Datto for around $1.5 billion and merged it with the Vista portfolio company Autotask Corporation, with McChord remaining CEO of the combined business. McChord stepped down as CEO in October 2018 but stayed on the board, and in January 2019 Datto named Tim Weller as his successor. Weller had joined the company as chief financial officer in 2017, having previously served as CFO of Akamai Technologies — where he led its initial public offering—and of the clean-energy company Enel X.

Datto acquired the Australian procurement-platform company Gluh in July 2020, and that October it went public through an initial public offering on the New York Stock Exchange, selling 22 million shares to raise $594 million. The company made a further acquisition in January 2022, buying the Austin-based threat detection and response firm Infocyte. In June 2022, Datto itself was acquired by Kaseya in a $6.2 billion transaction.

== See also ==
- Data recovery hardware
- List of networking hardware vendors
- List of data recovery software
