= The Reload =

Subscription-based digital publication

- Founder: Stephen Gutowski
- Founded: 2021
- Country: United States
- Website: thereload.com

The Reload is a publication about gun politics in the United States. Founded by Stephen Gutowski in 2021, the subscription-based website is intended as a response to what Gutowski characterizes as misinformation about firearms in the mainstream media. Gutowski is the sole editor and journalist for the self-published publication, which has been described as pro-Second Amendment.

== Background ==
Prior to founding The Reload, Stephen Gutowski worked as a beat reporter on the topic of guns at the conservative Washington Free Beacon for almost seven years. He is a certified firearms instructor. Gutowski decided to leave the Free Beacon after observing the amount of profit other commentators were making by moving to the subscription-based platform Substack.

== Establishment ==
The Reload was founded by Stephen Gutowski in 2021. A subscription-based website, it is intended as a response to what Gutowski characterizes as misinformation about firearms and related issues in the mainstream media. Gutowski built the website himself.

== Structure ==
=== Editorial structure ===
Gutowski is the editor, publisher, and journalist for The Reload.

=== Pricing ===
As of April 2021, a subscription to the publication cost $10 per month.

== Stances ==
National Public Radio has described The Reload as "a pro-Second Amendment gun issue publication".
