= Emsisoft =

- Company type: Private
- Industry: Computer security
- Founded: 2003
- Founder: Christian Mairoll
- Headquarters: Nelson, New Zealand
- Area served: Worldwide
- Products: Emsisoft Anti-Virus
- Website: www.emsisoft.com

Emsisoft Ltd. (est. 2003) is a New Zealand-based anti-virus software distributed company. They are notable for decrypting ransomware attacks to restore data.

== History ==
Emsisoft is an anti-malware and cybersecurity software and consulting company founded in Austria in 2003 by Christian Mairoll. The company makes anti-malware software and decryption tools used by companies and individuals to help them recover computer files encrypted in ransomware attacks. It also tracks and generates studies on ransomware attacks.

Mairoll, who is CEO, relocated to rural New Zealand in 2014, moving Emsisoft’s headquarters to the country, while its employees across Europe, Asia and the United States remained remote.

In 2019, Emsisoft donated decryption tools to Europol's No More Ransom project. The company’s decryption tools were also used to help resolve the Kaseya VSA ransomware attack, DarkSide and BlackMatter ransomware attacks against dozens of companies across the U.S., Europe and Britain in 2021.

Ireland’s National Cyber Security Centre used Emsisoft’s decryption tools in May 2021 to help the country's health service department recover from a ransomware attack.

In early 2021, Emsisoft suffered a system data breach due to a configuration error, leading to the release of a database containing log records, including email addresses, generated by Emsisoft, that were accessed by at least one unauthorized individual. After detecting the attack, Emsisoft implemented security mechanisms, including disconnecting the compromised system and investigated the incident using forensic analysis. Customers were notified and Emsisoft issued a public apology for the incident.

== Technology ==
Emsisoft's anti-malware technology is called Emsisoft Anti-Malware and has three versions: Anti-Malware Home, Business Security and Enterprise Security. The company also makes an extension for the web browsers Google Chrome, Firefox and Microsoft Edge that enables blocking access to malicious and phishing websites.
