= 2021 in the United States =

- Decades: 2000s; 2010s; 2020s; 2030s
- See also: History of the United States (2016–present); Timeline of United States history (2010–present); List of years in the United States

This article outlines United States-related events which occurred in the year 2021.

The COVID-19 pandemic continued to heavily impact the US, with the emergence of numerous COVID-19 variants leading to a substantial rise in both infections and deaths across the country.

Though Donald Trump lost his bid to be re-elected president of the United States to former vice president Joe Biden, Trump's attempts to overturn the 2020 United States presidential election have continued throughout the year. On January 6, a minority of pro-Trump protestors stormed the Capitol building and temporarily halted the formal counting of electoral votes in Congress.

2021 was additionally defined by protests against COVID-19 lockdowns in response to the pandemic, as well as the beginning of a period of high inflation and ongoing protests mostly against police brutality. The year also saw an extremely active Atlantic hurricane season, a destructive wildfire season in California, and a power crisis in Texas.

== Incumbents ==
=== Federal government ===
- President:

Donald Trump (R-Florida) (until January 20)
Joe Biden (D-Delaware) (starting January 20)

- Vice President:

Mike Pence (R-Indiana) (until January 20)
Kamala Harris (D-California) (starting January 20)

- Chief Justice: John Roberts (Maryland)
- Speaker of the House of Representatives: Nancy Pelosi (D-California)
- Senate Majority Leader:

Mitch McConnell (R-Kentucky) (until January 20)
Chuck Schumer (D-New York) (starting January 20)

- Congress: 116th (until January 3), 117th (starting January 3)

==== State governments ====
Governors and lieutenant governors

=== Governors ===
- Governor of Alabama: Kay Ivey (Republican)
- Governor of Alaska: Mike Dunleavy (Republican)
- Governor of Arizona: Doug Ducey (Republican)
- Governor of Arkansas: Asa Hutchinson (Republican)
- Governor of California: Gavin Newsom (Democratic)
- Governor of Colorado: Jared Polis (Democratic)
- Governor of Connecticut: Ned Lamont (Democratic)
- Governor of Delaware: John Carney (Democratic)
- Governor of Florida: Ron DeSantis (Republican)
- Governor of Georgia: Brian Kemp (Republican)
- Governor of Hawaii: David Ige (Democratic)
- Governor of Idaho: Brad Little (Republican)
- Governor of Illinois: J. B. Pritzker (Democratic)
- Governor of Indiana: Eric Holcomb (Republican)
- Governor of Iowa: Kim Reynolds (Republican)
- Governor of Kansas: Laura Kelly (Democratic)
- Governor of Kentucky: Andy Beshear (Democratic)
- Governor of Louisiana: John Bel Edwards (Democratic)
- Governor of Maine: Janet Mills (Democratic)
- Governor of Maryland: Larry Hogan (Republican)
- Governor of Massachusetts: Charlie Baker (Republican)
- Governor of Michigan: Gretchen Whitmer (Democratic)
- Governor of Mississippi: Tate Reeves (Republican)
- Governor of Missouri: Mike Parson (Republican)
- Governor of Minnesota: Tim Walz (Democratic)
- Governor of Montana: Steve Bullock (Democratic) (until January 4), Greg Gianforte (Republican) (since January 4)
- Governor of Nebraska: Pete Ricketts (Republican)
- Governor of Nevada: Steve Sisolak (Democratic)
- Governor of New Hampshire: Chris Sununu (Republican)
- Governor of New Jersey: Phil Murphy (Democratic)
- Governor of New Mexico: Michelle Lujan Grisham (Democratic)
- Governor of New York: Andrew Cuomo (Democratic) (until August 23), Kathy Hochul (Democratic) (since August 24)
- Governor of North Carolina: Roy Cooper (Democratic)
- Governor of North Dakota: Doug Burgum (Republican)
- Governor of Ohio: Mike DeWine (Republican)
- Governor of Oklahoma: Kevin Stitt (Republican)
- Governor of Oregon: Kate Brown (Democratic)
- Governor of Pennsylvania: Tom Wolf (Democratic)
- Governor of Rhode Island: Gina Raimondo (Democratic) (until March 2), Daniel McKee (Democratic) (since March 2)
- Governor of South Carolina: Henry McMaster (Republican)
- Governor of South Dakota: Kristi Noem (Republican)
- Governor of Tennessee: Bill Lee (Republican)
- Governor of Texas: Greg Abbott (Republican)
- Governor of Utah: Gary Herbert (Republican) (until January 4), Spencer Cox (Republican) (since January 4)
- Governor of Vermont: Phil Scott (Republican)
- Governor of Virginia: Ralph Northam (Democratic)
- Governor of Washington: Jay Inslee (Democratic)
- Governor of West Virginia: Jim Justice (Republican)
- Governor of Wisconsin: Tony Evers (Democratic)
- Governor of Wyoming: Mark Gordon (Republican)

=== Lieutenant governors ===
- Lieutenant Governor of Alabama: Will Ainsworth (Republican)
- Lieutenant Governor of Alaska: Kevin Meyer (Republican)
- Lieutenant Governor of Arkansas: Tim Griffin (Republican)
- Lieutenant Governor of California: Eleni Kounalakis (Democratic)
- Lieutenant Governor of Colorado: Dianne Primavera (Democratic)
- Lieutenant Governor of Connecticut: Susan Bysiewicz (Democratic)
- Lieutenant Governor of Delaware: Bethany Hall-Long (Democratic)
- Lieutenant Governor of Florida: Jeanette Nunez (Republican)
- Lieutenant Governor of Georgia: Geoff Duncan (Republican)
- Lieutenant Governor of Hawaii: Josh Green (Democratic)
- Lieutenant Governor of Idaho: Janice McGeachin (Republican)
- Lieutenant Governor of Illinois: Juliana Stratton (Democratic)
- Lieutenant Governor of Indiana: Suzanne Crouch (Republican)
- Lieutenant Governor of Iowa: Adam Gregg (Republican)
- Lieutenant Governor of Kansas: Lynn Rogers (Democratic) (until January 2), David Toland (Democratic) (since January 2)
- Lieutenant Governor of Kentucky: Jacqueline Coleman (Democratic)
- Lieutenant Governor of Louisiana: Billy Nungesser (Republican)
- Lieutenant Governor of Maryland: Boyd Rutherford (Republican)
- Lieutenant Governor of Massachusetts: Karyn Polito (Republican)
- Lieutenant Governor of Michigan: Garlin Gilchrist (Democratic)
- Lieutenant Governor of Minnesota: Peggy Flanagan (Democratic)
- Lieutenant Governor of Mississippi: Delbert Hosemann (Republican)
- Lieutenant Governor of Missouri: Mike Kehoe (Republican)
- Lieutenant Governor of Montana: Mike Cooney (Democratic) (until January 4), Kristen Juras (Republican) (since January 4)
- Lieutenant Governor of Nebraska: Mike Foley (Republican)
- Lieutenant Governor of Nevada:
  - Kate Marshall (Democratic) (until September 17)
  - Vacant (September 17 – December 16)
  - Lisa Cano Burkhead (Democratic) (since December 16)
- Lieutenant Governor of New Jersey: Sheila Oliver (Democratic)
- Lieutenant Governor of New Mexico: Howie Morales (Democratic)
- Lieutenant Governor of New York:
  - Kathy Hochul (Democratic) (until August 23)
  - Andrea Stewart-Cousins (Democratic) (acting: August 24 to September 9)
  - Brian Benjamin (since September 9)
- Lieutenant Governor of North Carolina: Dan Forest (Republican) (until January 4), Mark Robinson (Republican) (since January 4)
- Lieutenant Governor of North Dakota: Brent Sanford (Republican)
- Lieutenant Governor of Ohio: Jon A. Husted (Republican)
- Lieutenant Governor of Oklahoma: Matt Pinnell (Republican)
- Lieutenant Governor of Pennsylvania: John Fetterman (Democratic)
- Lieutenant Governor of Rhode Island:
  - Daniel McKee (Democratic) (until March 2)
  - Vacant (March 2 – April 14)
  - Sabina Matos (Democratic) (since April 14)
- Lieutenant Governor of South Carolina: Pamela Evette (Republican)
- Lieutenant Governor of South Dakota: Larry Rhoden (Republican)
- Lieutenant Governor of Tennessee: Randy McNally (Republican)
- Lieutenant Governor of Texas: Dan Patrick (Republican)
- Lieutenant Governor of Utah: Spencer Cox (Republican) (until January 4), Deidre Henderson (Republican) (since January 4)
- Lieutenant Governor of Vermont: David Zuckerman (Progressive) (until January 7), Molly Gray (Democratic) (since January 7)
- Lieutenant Governor of Virginia: Justin Fairfax (Democratic)
- Lieutenant Governor of Washington: Cyrus Habib (Democratic) (until January 13), Denny Heck (Democratic) (since January 13)
- Lieutenant Governor of Wisconsin: Mandela Barnes (Democratic)

== Ongoing events ==
- COVID-19 pandemic in the United States
- COVID-19 protests in the United States
- United States racial unrest (2020–2023)
- Aftermath of the January 6 United States Capitol attack

== Events ==
=== January ===
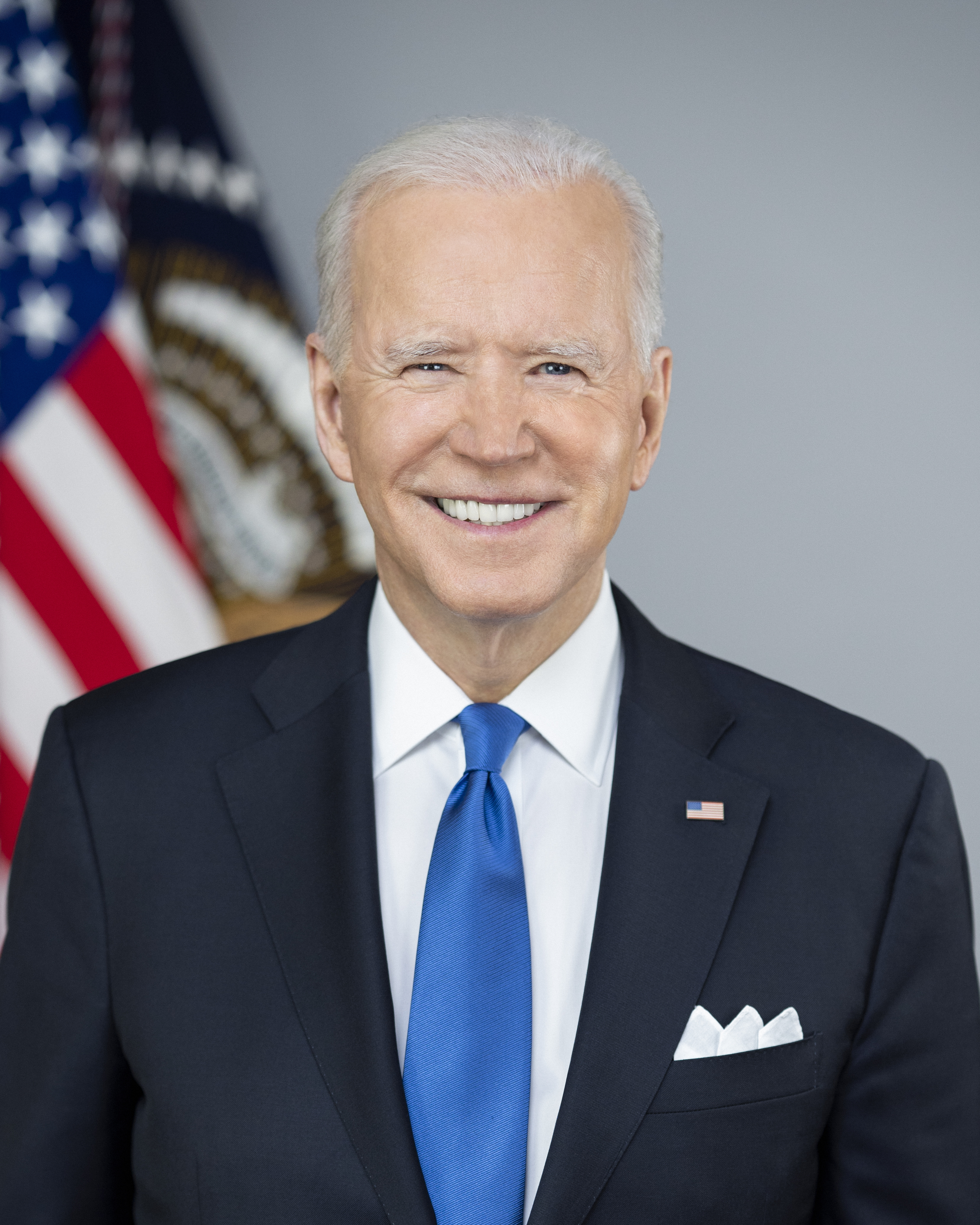
January 20: Joe Biden becomes the 46th U.S. president.

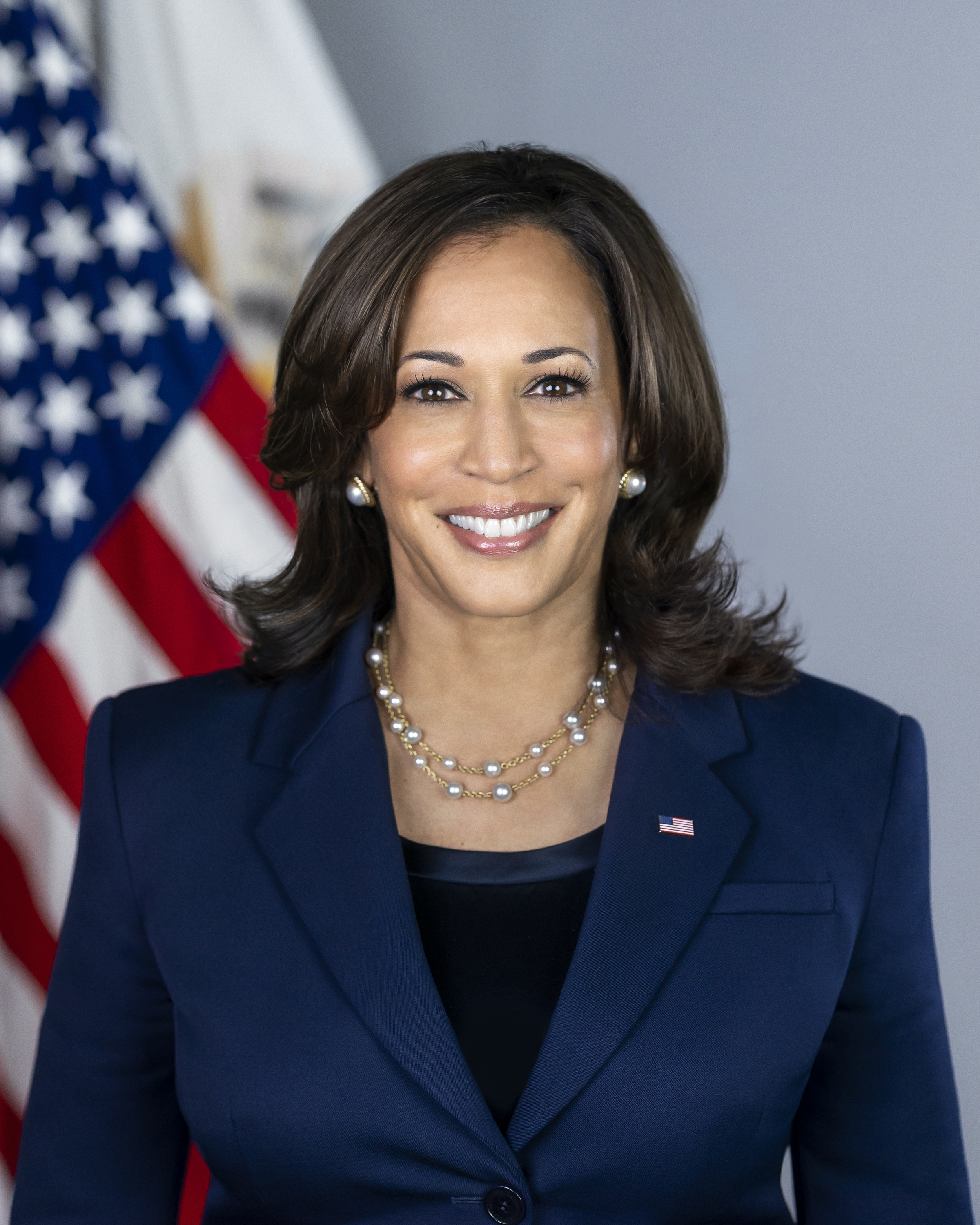
January 20: Kamala Harris becomes the 49th U.S. vice president.

- January 1
  - COVID-19 pandemic in the United States: The United States surpasses 20 million cases of COVID-19.
  - The U.S. Senate votes 81–13 for the National Defense Authorization Act 2021, overriding a veto by President Donald Trump for the only time in his presidency.
  - Montana Initiative 190 comes into effect, making Montana the 13th state to legalize recreational cannabis.
  - Public Domain Day: All books and films published in 1925 enter the public domain in the United States.
- January 2 – COVID-19 pandemic: New York becomes the fourth state to surpass one million COVID-19 cases, following Texas, California, and Florida.
- January 3 – The Washington Post publishes an audio recording of President Donald Trump urging Georgia Secretary of State Brad Raffensperger to change the state's 2020 presidential election results in his favor.
- January 4 – COVID-19 pandemic: Michigan surpasses 500,000 confirmed COVID-19 cases.
- January 5
  - Two runoff elections are held in Georgia to decide U.S. Senate seats, with incumbent Senator Kelly Loeffler facing Raphael Warnock and Senator David Perdue facing Jon Ossoff.
  - President Donald Trump signs an executive order barring transactions with eight Chinese software applications (including Alipay, WeChat Pay, and Tencent QQ) citing concerns about Chinese access to sensitive data of American citizens.
- January 6
  - Five people die and at least 56 police officers and five civilians are injured after supporters of President Donald Trump storm the United States Capitol, forcing Congress to evacuate. Congress reconvenes and formally certifies Joe Biden as the next president of the United States on the morning of January 7. President Trump formally concedes to an orderly transition of power to Joe Biden.
  - During the Electoral College vote count, Senator Ted Cruz and Representative Paul Gosar object to Arizona's election results, the first time a vote is forced to accept or reject the objection since 2004. Representative Scott Perry and Senator Josh Hawley subsequently object to Pennsylvania's election results.
- January 7
  - Tesla and SpaceX CEO Elon Musk becomes the world's richest person, with a net worth exceeding $185 billion, surpassing Amazon CEO Jeff Bezos.
  - Facebook indefinitely bans President Donald Trump from all of its platforms, citing his role in the January 6 Capitol riot. Twitter permanently suspends Trump's personal account the next day, January 8.
  - Betsy DeVos resigns as Education Secretary in protest of President Trump's role in the January 6 Capitol riot.
- January 8
  - Amid an industry crackdown on extremist content following the January 6 Capitol riot, Google removes the mobile app of social networking service Parler from Google Play. Apple suspends the app from its App Store the next day, January 9. Parler goes offline a day later, January 10, when Amazon ceases to provide its cloud computing services.
  - After 36 years, Alex Trebek's final episode of Jeopardy! airs. Ken Jennings becomes the temporary host on January 11 as the search for a new permanent host continues.
- January 9 – The Trump administration lifts longstanding restrictions on contacts between Taiwanese and U.S. officials.
- January 11 – Alabama Crimson Tide football head coach Nick Saban surpasses former head coach Bear Bryant for most national titles won in college football history, seven total, following a 52–24 win over the Ohio State Buckeyes in the 2021 CFB National Championship.
- January 13
  - Donald Trump becomes the first U.S. president to be impeached for a second time, following a 232–197 vote in the House of Representatives.
  - Former Governor of Michigan Rick Snyder is charged with two counts of willful neglect of duty in connection with the Flint water crisis. Former state health director Nick Lyon and many others are also charged.
  - Lisa Marie Montgomery is executed by the federal government, the first female federal inmate to be executed since 1953.
  - COVID-19 pandemic: The NHL's shortened 2020–21 season begins, running for 56 games per team and ending on May 8.
- January 14 – COVID-19 pandemic: Texas becomes the first state to administer one million doses of the COVID-19 vaccine.
- January 15 – The National Rifle Association of America files for Chapter 11 bankruptcy protection and announces plans to reincorporate in Texas.
- January 16
  - Dustin Higgs is executed by the federal government, becoming the 13th and final person to be executed by the Trump administration.
  - President-elect Joe Biden announces he will elevate the White House Office of Science and Technology Policy to a Cabinet-level position, making its nominated director Eric Lander the first biologist in the Cabinet, if confirmed by the U.S. Senate.
- January 17 – Riley June Williams, a 22-year-old woman suspected of stealing House Speaker Nancy Pelosi's laptop during the January 6 Capitol riot, is charged by the FBI with intent to sell the device to Russian foreign intelligence services.
- January 18
  - Vice President-elect Kamala Harris resigns from her U.S. Senate seat. Her chosen successor, former California Secretary of State Alex Padilla, becomes the first Latino to represent California in the Senate.
  - The 1776 Report is released by the 1776 Commission.
- January 19
  - COVID-19 pandemic: Nationwide COVID-19 deaths surpass 400,000.
  - On his final full day in office, President Trump issues pardons for 144 people.
  - New York State Office of Court Administration employee Brendan Hunt is arrested by the FBI for encouraging public executions of members of the U.S. Congress on social media.
- January 20
  - Joe Biden is sworn in as the 46th president of the United States. Kamala Harris becomes the first woman, first Asian American, and first African American to become Vice President of the United States. Donald Trump becomes the first outgoing president to boycott his successor's inauguration since Andrew Johnson in 1869.
  - President Biden signs his first executive orders reversing several Trump administration actions, including rejoining the Paris Agreement and the World Health Organization, repealing the 2017 travel bans, ending funding for the Mexico–United States border wall, and revoking the permit for the Keystone XL pipeline.
- January 21 – The Food and Drug Administration (FDA) approves Cabenuva as a complete regimen for the treatment of HIV/AIDS.
- January 22 – Recreational cannabis sales begin in Arizona.
- January 24
  - COVID-19 pandemic: Nationwide confirmed COVID-19 cases surpass 25 million.
  - The Tampa Bay Buccaneers advance to Super Bowl LV after a 31–26 victory against the Green Bay Packers, the first time an NFL team will play the Super Bowl on their home field.
- January 25
  - President Biden repeals the Trump administration's ban on transgender personnel in the military.
  - COVID-19 pandemic: Minnesota reports the first national case of the Lineage P.1 variant of SARS-CoV-2.
  - Dominion Voting Systems sues former New York City mayor Rudy Giuliani, accusing him of defamation during the 2020 presidential election.
- January 26
  - COVID-19 pandemic: The Biden administration announces it will purchase 200 million COVID-19 vaccine doses from Pfizer/BioNTech and Moderna, in addition to the prior order of 400 million.
- January 27
  - The U.S. Army announces new personal grooming and appearance standards, relaxing rules regarding makeup and jewelry and allowing for more diverse hairstyles.
  - President Biden signs a series of executive orders regarding climate change, including halting new oil and gas leases on public lands, procuring an all-electric federal vehicle fleet, and doubling offshore wind power by 2030.
  - One of the 14 men accused in the Gretchen Whitmer kidnapping plot pleads guilty and agrees to testify against his co-defendants, with sentencing set for July 8.
  - Investment funds report major losses after video game retailer GameStop's stock prices rise 900 times their record low. The next day, January 28, some financial services companies restrict the trade of stocks of several companies, including GameStop, triggering outrage online.
- January 31–February 3 – A major winter storm strikes the Northeastern United States, bringing nearly 3 feet (0.91 m) of snow to some areas, causing over 575,000 power outages, and killing six people.

=== February ===
- February 1
  - Oregon Measure 110 comes into effect, making Oregon the first state to decriminalize the possession of small quantities of all illicit drugs.
  - Actress Evan Rachel Wood alleges that Marilyn Manson sexually abused and groomed her as a teenager. Four other women make similar claims while Manson denies the allegations. The next day, February 2, Manson is dropped by his record label, Loma Vista Recordings, and removed from two TV shows: American Gods and Creepshow.
- February 2
  - 2021 Sunrise, Florida shootout: During the service of a warrant, a suspect kills two FBI agents and injures three others before barricading himself inside his home. He is later found dead, reportedly from a self-inflicted gunshot wound. The shootout was the most violent incident in the FBI's history since 1986.
  - The United States Senate votes 50–49 to pass a budget resolution that would allow Democrats to pass President Biden's $1.9 trillion relief package without support from Republicans. Three days later, February 5, the Senate passes a $1.9 trillion budget for COVID-19 relief. The 50–50 tie-breaker vote is broken by Vice President Kamala Harris.
  - Amazon founder and CEO Jeff Bezos steps down after more than 26 years to focus on Blue Origin and names Amazon Web Services CEO Andy Jassy as his successor.
- February 4
  - The United States House of Representatives votes 230–199 to remove Representative Marjorie Taylor Greene (R-GA) from her assignments on the Education and Labor and Budget committees and following controversial comments made about the mass shootings in Parkland and Sandy Hook, as well as calling for violence towards Democrats, and the support of numerous conspiracy theories such as QAnon.
  - Smartmatic files a $2.7 billion defamation lawsuit against the Fox Corporation and its cable news hosts Lou Dobbs, Jeanine Pirro, and Maria Bartiromo as well as frequent guests and ex-President Donald Trump's former lawyers Rudy Giuliani and Sidney Powell, who spread false conspiracy theories about them after the 2020 United States presidential election.
- February 5
  - U.S. Reps Andrew Clyde (R-GA) and Louie Gohmert (R-TX) are fined $5,000 for refusing to go through the metal detectors outside the House chamber.
  - The U.S. Food and Drug Administration approves Breyanzi to treat large B-cell lymphoma.
- February 7
  - The Tampa Bay Buccaneers win Super Bowl LV, defeating the Kansas City Chiefs 31–9, making them the first wildcard team to win the Super Bowl since the 2010 Green Bay Packers and the first to win it in their home stadium.
  - U.S. Rep Ron Wright (R–TX) passes away at the age of 67 after contracting COVID-19, making him the first sitting member of Congress to die of the disease.
- February 8 – South Dakota Constitutional Amendment A, which would have legalized recreational cannabis in South Dakota on July 1, is struck down as unconstitutional by judge Christina Klinger.
- February 9
  - The second impeachment trial of Donald Trump begins. He is acquitted four days later, February 13 with a 57–43 vote in the Senate, ten votes short of the required two-thirds majority for conviction.
  - COVID-19 drug development: The FDA issues an emergency use authorization (EUA) for bamlanivimab and etesevimab.
- February 11
  - President Biden terminates the national emergency declaration on the US-Mexico border which President Trump had used to pay for the wall.
  - In Fort Worth, Texas, at least six people are killed in an accident involving 133 vehicles on Interstate 35W, affected by weather conditions left by a snowstorm system.
- February 12
  - The United States Senate votes by unanimous consent to award United States Capitol Police officer Eugene Goodman the Congressional Gold Medal for keeping rioters away from the Senate chamber during the storming of the United States Capitol.
  - The U.S. Food and Drug Administration approves Cosela as the first therapy in its class to reduce the frequency of chemotherapy-induced bone marrow suppression.
- February 15 – House Speaker Nancy Pelosi announces that Congress will establish a 9/11-styled commission to investigate the January 6 riot at the United States Capitol.
- February 13–17 – A major winter storm kills 58 people in the United States (and 12 in Mexico) and causes over 9,724,000 power outages across 13 states in the Midwest and Southwest, with Southwest Power Pool declaring an "energy emergency".
- February 17
  - COVID-19 pandemic: North Dakota confirms their first case of the UK variant of SARS-CoV-2.
  - The former Trump Plaza hotel in Atlantic City, New Jersey is demolished in a controlled implosion.
  - The U.S. Food and Drug Administration approves the Patient Specific Talus Spacer 3D-printed talus implant for humanitarian use. The Patient Specific Talus Spacer is the first in the world and first-of-its-kind implant to replace the talus—the bone in the ankle joint.
- February 18 – NASA successfully lands its Perseverance rover on Mars, seven months after launching.
- February 19 – The U.S. officially rejoins the Paris Agreement, 107 days after leaving.
- February 22
  - New York Rangers winger Artemi Panarin takes a personal leave of absence after the Russian tabloid Komsomolskaya Pravda publishes a story in which former Kontinental Hockey League coach Andrei Nazarov accuses him of sexually assaulting an 18-year old Latvian woman in Riga. The team releases a statement calling the allegations against Panarin an "intimidation tactic" against him after speaking out against "recent political events", most notably expressing his support for Russian opposition leader Alexei Navalny, who was detained upon return to Russia from Germany.
  - Enabling legislation for New Jersey Public Question 1 is signed into law by governor Phil Murphy, making New Jersey the 14th state to legalize recreational cannabis.
  - The Supreme Court rejects a last-ditch attempt by Donald Trump to shield his financial records, and issues an order requiring his accountants to turn over his tax and other records to prosecutors in New York.
  - Dominion Voting Systems sues Mike Lindell for $1.3 billion for defamation, claiming he spread false conspiracy theories about them after the 2020 presidential election.
  - COVID-19 pandemic – The United States surpasses 500,000 deaths from COVID-19. In response, President Biden orders flags to fly at half-mast for five days.
- February 23
  - Golf champion Tiger Woods is seriously injured in a car crash, and undergoes surgery at Harbor–UCLA Medical Center.
- February 24 – COVID-19 pandemic: Johnson & Johnson's vaccine candidate receives emergency use authorization from the FDA. The single-shot vaccine is 66% effective in combating the virus and can be stored in regular, unspecialized refrigerators.
- February 25
  - COVID-19 pandemic: The number of vaccines administered in the United States exceeds 50 million.
  - The U.S. Food and Drug Administration approves Amondys 45 for the treatment of Duchenne muscular dystrophy. This is the first FDA-approved targeted treatment for people with the exon 45 skipping mutation.
- February 26
  - Washington's felony drug possession law is struck down as unconstitutional by the Washington Supreme Court, making Washington the 2nd state (after Oregon) to remove criminal penalties for possession of illicit drugs.
  - Representative Paul Gosar and former Representative Steve King attend The America First Political Action Conference, whose organizer is Nick Fuentes. Gosar's attendance was the subject of controversy.
- February 27
  - The House of Representatives passes the American Rescue Plan Act, President Biden's $1.9 trillion COVID-19 relief package. It will next be sent to the Senate.
  - Virginia's legislature passes an adult-use cannabis legalization law, though the law (including both retail sales and simple possession) initially did not come into effect until 2024. It is later amended to legalize cannabis possession in Virginia beginning on July 1, 2021, while keeping the original 2024 retail sales start date.
  - New York Governor Andrew Cuomo is accused of sexual harassment by a second former aide to the governor Charlotte Bennett after alleging that he harassed her late last spring, during the height of the state's fight against the coronavirus.

=== March ===
- March 2
  - A major car crash in Imperial County, California kills 13 people and injures 13 others.
  - COVID-19 pandemic
    - Against CDC warnings, Texas Governor Greg Abbott lifts the statewide mask requirement and allows businesses to open at 100% capacity beginning March 10.
    - Oregon reports its first cases of the Lineage P.1 variant in two people from Douglas County who previously traveled to Brazil.
- March 5
  - COVID-19 pandemic
    - Illinois reports its first case of the Lineage P.1 variant first detected in Brazil in a person from Chicago.
    - Tennessee reports its first case of the 501.V2 variant first detected in South Africa.
- March 6 – The Senate passes the American Rescue Plan Act, President Biden's $1.9 trillion COVID-19 relief package.
- March 7 – March 2021 Hawaii floods – Floods in Hawaii leave one missing, destroy six homes, force evacuations, and leave 1,300 without electricity.
- March 8
  - Missouri Senator Roy Blunt announces he will not run for re-election in 2022.
  - The trial for Derek Chauvin, a former police officer involved in the murder of George Floyd last May, begins with jury selection.
  - COVID-19 pandemic
    - Hawaii reports its first case of South Africa's 501.V2 variant in an Oahu resident with no travel history.
    - Michigan reports its first case of the 501.V2 variant in a child from Jackson County.
- March 10
  - COVID-19 pandemic
    - Michigan surpasses 600,000 confirmed cases of COVID-19.
    - New Jersey reports its first case of 501.V2 variant first detected in South Africa.
  - The United States House of Representatives votes 220–211 to pass the $1.9 trillion American Rescue Plan Act of 2021. The stimulus bill was signed into law by President Biden the next day.
  - Cannabis in South Dakota
    - Attorneys defending Amendment A, which would have legalized cannabis in the state on July 1 before being struck down by a lower court judge, submit their arguments to the South Dakota Supreme Court.
    - An attempt to delay the effective date of South Dakota's medical cannabis law from July 2021 until January 2022 fails due to disagreements between the South Dakota House and Senate on the proposed legislation.
- March 11
  - COVID-19 pandemic
    - Minnesota reports its first case of the South African 501.V2 variant of COVID-19. The patient is a person from the Twin Cities area who became ill on January 24 and tested positive on January 29.
    - Washington reports its first case of the Lineage P.1 variant of SARS-CoV-2, which originated in Brazil. The patient is a person from the King County.
    - South Dakota reports its first case of the Lineage B.1.1.7 variant of SARS-CoV-2, which originated in the United Kingdom.
- March 12
  - The family of George Floyd, the man murdered while in police custody last May, sparking nationwide (and later worldwide) protests against police brutality and systemic racism, settles their lawsuit against the city of Minneapolis for $27 million.
  - COVID-19 pandemic
    - COVID-19 vaccination in the United States: The U.S. surpasses 100 million COVID-19 vaccine doses administered.
    - Arizona reports its first three cases of the Lineage P.1 variant, which originated in Brazil.
- March 14 – Marvin Scott died on March 14, 2021, in police custody at a correctional facility in McKinney, Texas.
- March 14–15 – A blizzard in Colorado brings over 24.1 inches (61 cm) of snow, passing a record of 23.8 inches (60 cm) set in 1982, to become the fourth largest recorded snowfall in Denver history and the largest since 2003 when the city received 31.8 inches (81 cm). It also leaves tens of thousands of people without power and some stranded in their cars after roads are closed. In Wyoming, over 31 inches (79 cm) were received in Cheyenne, and 52.5 inches (133 cm) in the Laramie Range.
- March 15 – Three people are killed and one injured when a small plane crashes in Pembroke Pines, Florida.
- March 16
  - COVID-19 pandemic: Massachusetts confirms its first case of the Lineage P.1 variant that originated in Brazil.
  - 2021 Atlanta spa shootings – Eight people are killed and one is injured in a trio of shootings at spas in the Metro Atlanta, Georgia area. A suspect is arrested 150 miles south of Atlanta later that day and charged with eight counts of murder and one count of attempted murder two days later, March 18.
- March 17
  - The IRS announces that the deadline for Tax Day will be postponed to May 17.
  - COVID-19 pandemic: North Dakota confirms its first four cases of the California variant of SARS-CoV-2. Additionally, seven cases of the UK variant are also confirmed.
- March 18–19 – The U.S. and China hold talks in Alaska to discuss relations, with topics ranging from Taiwanese security to Black Lives Matter.
- March 19 – COVID-19 pandemic – Mississippi reports its first case of the 501.V2 variant, which was originally detected in South Africa, in a person in Harrison County.
- March 20 – A special election is held in Louisiana's 5th congressional district, vacant since Representative-elect Luke Letlow died on December 29, 2020. Letlow's widow Julia Letlow wins with 67,203 of the 103,616 votes cast (64.86%).
- March 22 – 2021 Boulder shooting: 10 people are shot dead at a supermarket in Boulder, Colorado. It is the third deadliest mass shooting in the state's history, behind the 1999 Columbine High School massacre which left 13 dead and 24 injured, and the 2012 Aurora theater shooting which left 12 dead and 70 injured. A 21-year-old suspect, Ahmad Al Issa, is arrested after being shot in the leg by police.
- March 24
  - COVID-19 pandemic: Georgia reports its first case of the Lineage P.1 variant, which was originally detected in Brazil. It was found in a resident in Newton County.
  - COVID-19 pandemic: More than 30 million confirmed cases of COVID-19 in the United States.
- March 25
  - Economic impact of the COVID-19 pandemic: The Senate votes 92–7 to pass the Paycheck Protection Program Extension Act of 2021, a bill that would extend the Paycheck Protection Program until May 31. President Biden signed the bill into law on March 30.
  - Tornadoes in Alabama kill five people, destroy several homes, and cause thousands of power outages.
  - The North Dakota state senate rejects a bill to legalize recreational cannabis in the state by a 10–37 vote.
- March 26
  - COVID-19 pandemic
    - Maine reports its first case of the Lineage P.1 variant, which was originally detected in Brazil.
    - Wisconsin confirms their first cases of the Lineage P.1 and 501.V2 variants of SARS-CoV-2.
    - Arizona reports its first case of the 501.V2 variant, which was originally detected in South Africa.
  - New Jersey amends its alcohol and cannabis laws to allow police to notify parents or guardians after a first-time offense by a minor, following strong opposition to the prohibition on first-time notifications implemented when New Jersey legalized cannabis the previous month.
  - The U.S. Food and Drug Administration (FDA) approves Abecma to treat multiple myeloma. Abecma is the first cell-based gene therapy approved by the FDA for the treatment of multiple myeloma.
- March 29
  - In Minnesota, opening statements begin at the trial of former police officer Derek Chauvin, who is accused of murdering 46-year-old black man George Floyd by kneeling on his neck.
  - The Arkansas Senate passed, HB1570, a bill that prohibited normally functioning and physically healthy minors from puberty blockers, cross-sex hormones, and genital and non-genital invasive surgical alterations.
  - A judge orders three men charged with plotting to kidnap Michigan Governor Gretchen Whitmer to stand trial, after a three-day preliminary hearing. Threat of terrorism charges are also dismissed against two of the defendants.
  - Killing of Adam Toledo – A 13-year-old Latino boy, Adam Toledo, is shot and killed by an officer of the Chicago Police Department.
- March 30 – Both houses of the New York State Legislature pass a bill to legalize recreational cannabis in New York, which, upon being signed by governor Andrew Cuomo the following day, made New York the 15th state to legalize recreational cannabis.
- March 31
  - 2021 Orange, California office shooting – Four people are killed and two others, including the suspect, are injured in a shooting at an office building.
  - President Biden unveils a $2 trillion infrastructure plan.
  - Governor Greg Gianforte signs a bill that bans Sanctuary cities in the state of Montana into law. Montana becomes the 13th state to ban sanctuary cities.

=== April ===
- April 2
  - United States Capitol car attack: The Capitol Building in Washington, D.C. is placed under lockdown after a suspect rams a car into a barricade on Constitution Avenue and exits the vehicle holding a knife. Two police officers are injured in the attack and taken to a hospital, where one dies from his injuries. The suspect is killed by Capitol Police.
  - COVID-19 vaccination – The Centers for Disease Control and Prevention reports that over 100 million people have received their first dose of a COVID-19 vaccine.
- April 6
  - COVID-19 pandemic
    - COVID-19 vaccination – President Biden announces that the deadline for all states to make all adults eligible for the COVID-19 vaccine will be moved up from May 1 to April 19.
    - Colorado reports their first cases of the Lineage P.1 variant of SARS-CoV-2 in two people from Boulder County.
  - Transgender discrimination – The state of Arkansas becomes the first state to ban surgery, hormones and puberty blockers for transgender youths.
  - House Representative for Florida's 20th congressional district Alcee Hasting dies at age 84 from pancreatic cancer.
- April 7
  - COVID-19 pandemic – Oklahoma surpasses 8,000 deaths from COVID-19.
  - 2021 Rock Hill shooting – Six people are killed by gunshots at a house in Rock Hill, South Carolina. The shooter, former NFL cornerback Phillip Adams, later committed suicide.
- April 9
  - President Biden requests Congress to authorize a $1.5 trillion federal spending plan in 2022, which includes an emphasis on public health, as well as major increase in science and research funding.
  - The U.S. House Ethics Committee announces that they have opened an investigation into Rep. Matt Gaetz (R – FL) over sexual misconducts and federal sex-trafficking.
  - During his show, Tucker Carlson argued that the Democratic Party "is trying to replace the current electorate, the voters now casting ballots, with new people, more obedient voters from the Third World". He also said, "Everyone wants to make a racial issue out of it, 'Ooh, the white replacement theory.' No, no, no, this is a voting rights question. I have less political power because they are importing a brand-new electorate. Why should I sit back and take that?" The Anti-Defamation League (ADL) and others said that Carlson was endorsing the Great Replacement, a white nationalist conspiracy theory that claims white people are being systemically replaced through declining white birth rates and high rates of immigration. In an open letter to Fox News, ADL CEO Jonathan Greenblatt called for the network to fire Carlson.
- April 11
  - Killing of Daunte Wright – A police officer in Brooklyn Center, Minnesota, a suburb of Minneapolis, killed a black man during an attempted arrest following a traffic stop, leading to rioting and looting in the city in the subsequent days. The protests later spread to the surrounding area and other cities and states, as far away as Portland, Oregon. The suspect, Officer Kim Potter, later resigned and was charged with second-degree manslaughter.
  - COVID-19 pandemic – California surpasses 60,000 deaths from COVID-19.
- April 12
  - COVID-19 drug development – The U.S. government terminates a deal with Eli Lilly and Company for 350,856 remaining doses of the single antibody bamlanivimab that were scheduled to be delivered by the end of March. The deal will instead be focused on a supply of combined antibodies with etesevimab.
  - Microsoft announces the $20 billion acquisition of AI firm Nuance Communications, the second largest deal in its history, after LinkedIn in 2016.
- April 15
  - Chicago police release graphic footage of an officer shooting dead 13-year-old Adam Toledo in a dark alley.
  - Indianapolis FedEx shooting: Nine people are killed, including the shooter, and seven injured, in a mass shooting at a FedEx facility in Indianapolis.
- April 16
  - The media reports that U.S. Republican Representatives Marjorie Taylor Greene and Paul Gosar are forming the America First Caucus. It is scrapped within a day, following criticism from other GOP members.
  - COVID-19 drug development: The U.S. Food and Drug Administration (FDA) revokes the emergency use authorization (EUA) for bamlanivimab.
  - COVID-19 pandemic
    - Virginia reports its first two cases of the Lineage P.1 variant, which was originally detected in Brazil.
    - Michigan extends their restrictions on gatherings and dining to May 24 amid a rise of cases. The state also expands their mask mandate to children ages 2–4 years.
    - The number of vaccines administered in the United States exceeds 200 million.
- April 18 – COVID-19 vaccination: The CDC reports that over 50% of Americans have received at least one dose of a COVID-19 vaccine. At least 130 million adults have received the first dose, while 84 million adults have also received the second dose.
- April 20
    - Trial of Derek Chauvin: Derek Chauvin is found guilty on all counts in the murder of George Floyd.
    - Killing of Ma'Khia Bryant: A 16 year old in Columbus, Ohio is shot and killed by police officer, Nicholas Reardon.
- April 21
  - COVID-19 pandemic
    - Michigan surpasses 800,000 confirmed cases and 17,000 confirmed deaths.
    - South Dakota confirms their first case of the Lineage P.1 variant in Pennington County.
- April 22 – President Biden pledges to cut greenhouse gas emissions in half by 2030 compared to 2005 levels.
- April 24
  - A runoff election is held in Louisiana's 2nd congressional district vacant since Representative Cedric Richmond resigned to become the Director of the Office of Public Liaison and an advisor to President Biden. Troy Carter wins with 48,511 of the 87,806 votes cast (55.25%).
  - A viral Internet meme encourages users named Josh Swain to compete at an event in Lincoln, Nebraska and battle for the right to use the name Josh Swain. The event draws a crowd of several hundred people, and raises over $8,000 in charity.
- April 25 – The 93rd Academy Awards, the third in a row with no official host, are held at both Union Station and Dolby Theatre in Los Angeles. Due to the ceremony's delay from February 28 due to the impact of the COVID-19 pandemic on cinema, films from two calendar years were eligible at the same point, with the cut-off date being the intended original Awards date. Chloé Zhao's Nomadland wins three awards, including Best Picture, Best Director and Frances McDormand for Best Actress. David Fincher's Mank leads the nominations with ten, while Anthony Hopkins wins Best Actor for The Father (becoming the oldest winner in an acting category), Daniel Kaluuya Best Supporting Actor for Judas and the Black Messiah and Youn Yuh-jung Best Supporting Actress for Minari. Keeping in line with other award ceremonies reporting viewership declines, the telecast garners 10.4 million viewers according to Nielsen estimates, down 56% from the previous year and making the broadcast by far the lowest-rated in Oscar history.
- April 26 – COVID-19 pandemic – The CDC says that fully vaccinated Americans can go outside without wearing a mask unless they are in large crowds.
- April 27 – COVID-19 pandemic – Colorado surpasses 500,000 cases of COVID-19.
- April 28
  - 2021 Joe Biden speech to a joint session of Congress: On the eve of his 100th day in office, President Biden gives his first address to a joint session of Congress encouraging them to pass $4 trillion worth of spending bills, including the American Jobs Plan and the American Families Plan, both part of his Build Back Better Plan.
  - The South Dakota Supreme Court hears oral arguments on an appeal of a ruling which struck down South Dakota Amendment A, which would have legalized recreational cannabis in the state on July 1, 2021.
- April 30
  - COVID-19 pandemic
    - Travel restrictions related to the COVID-19 pandemic – The White House announces the U.S. will begin restricting travel from India starting May 4 due to rising cases of the Lineage B.1.617 which originated in the latter country.
    - Michigan reports its first case of Lineage B.1.617, first discovered in India, in a person from Clinton County.

=== May ===
- May 1 – Lubbock, Texas votes to become the largest city in U.S. to ban abortion with the "sanctuary city for the unborn".
- May 4 – COVID-19 pandemic – Michigan relaxes several restrictions regarding face mask requirements and outdoor gatherings.
- May 5 – South Carolina House votes to add firing squad to execution methods; South Carolina would become the fourth state to use firing squad after Mississippi, Oklahoma and Utah.
- May 7
  - Colonial Pipeline cyberattack: An oil pipeline in Houston is hacked by DarkSide causing the pipeline operator to shut down its entire network, the source of nearly half of the U.S. East Coast's fuel supply.
  - COVID-19 vaccines – Pfizer/BioNTech seek full approval from the FDA for the Pfizer–BioNTech COVID-19 vaccine.
- May 9 – 2021 Colorado Springs shooting: Seven people are shot dead at a birthday party in Colorado Springs, Colorado.
- May 10 – COVID-19 vaccination: The FDA authorizes the Pfizer–BioNTech COVID-19 vaccine for adolescents aged 12–15 years old.
- May 11 – The Colonial Pipeline shutdown enters its fifth day. Panic buying by motorists causes many eastern seaboard gas stations to begin running dry. U.S. Energy Secretary Jennifer Granholm urges calm and to not hoard.
- May 12
  - Colonial Pipeline begins restarting, but warns that it will take several days for things to return to normal operations.
  - COVID-19 vaccination – The Centers for Disease Control and Prevention (CDC) adopts the FDA recommendation to provide the Pfizer–BioNTech vaccine to adolescents aged 12–15 years old.
- May 13 – COVID-19 pandemic – The Centers for Disease Control and Prevention states that all "fully vaccinated people can resume activities without wearing a mask or physically distancing, except where required by federal, state, local, tribal, or territorial laws, rules, and regulations, including local business and workplace guidance".
- May 14
  - Colonial Pipeline operations return to normal late in the day, but gas outages at retail stations will take several days to clear.
  - Tennessee Gov. Bill Lee signs public school "bathroom bill", HB1233, into law. The bill specifies that schools must comply to reasonable requests made by students and staff to provide them with access to a reasonably private bathroom that is restricted to occupants of their same sex.
- May 17
  - Former Matt Gaetz associate Joel Greenberg pleads guilty to six charges of sex trafficking.
  - The U.S. Supreme Court agrees to take up Dobbs v. Jackson Women's Health Organization, a Mississippi case on abortion rights.
- May 18 – The U.S. Preventive Services Task Force lowers the age to begin routine screenings for colorectal cancer from 50 to 45.
- May 24
  - COVID-19 pandemic
    - The State Department tells Americans not to travel to Japan due to a spike in COVID-19 cases there.
    - Delaware reports their first case of the Lineage B.1.617 variant that originated in India.
  - A suspicious package is sent to the home of U.S. Senator Rand Paul (R–KY). The incident is being investigated by the Federal Bureau of Investigation and United States Capitol Police.
- May 25
  - 2021 George Floyd protests
    - New York City Mayoral candidate Shaun Donovan is arrested during a protest near the Holland Tunnel.
    - Protests break out across the country to mark the first anniversary of the murder of George Floyd.
  - Manhattan District Attorney Cyrus Vance Jr. announces that he has convened a grand jury in his criminal investigation into former President Trump over his real estate business, as well as the Trump Organization.
  - COVID-19 pandemic
    - COVID-19 vaccination – The CDC announces that 50% of the American adult population has been fully vaccinated.
    - COVID-19 vaccines – Moderna says that their vaccine is 100% effective in teenagers between the ages of 12 and 17 years old. They say that they will seek approval from the FDA in early June.
    - Michigan surpasses 19,000 confirmed deaths from COVID-19.
- May 26 – 2021 San Jose shooting: A mass shooting occurs at a Santa Clara Valley Transportation Authority rail yard in San Jose, California, leaving ten people dead, including the gunman who committed suicide.
- May 27 – The Department of Energy launches Perlmutter, the world's fastest AI-specialized supercomputer, with four exaflops of performance.
- May 30
  - 2021 Hialeah shooting: A mass shooting in Hialeah, Florida leaves two dead and 20 injured.
  - JBS S.A. cyberattack: A ransomware cyberattack hits several beef processing plants and slaughterhouses in Utah, Texas, Wisconsin, Nebraska, and Pennsylvania. Russian firm REvil has been accused of being the perpetrators of the attack.

=== June ===
- June 1
  - A firefighter is killed and another injured in a shooting at a Los Angeles County Fire Department station in Santa Clarita.
  - A special election is held in New Mexico to fill a vacancy in its 1st congressional district left by Deb Haaland when she resigned to become President Biden's Secretary of the Interior. Democrat Melanie Stansbury wins with 79,837 of the 132,262 votes cast (60.36%).
  - COVID-19 pandemic
  - SARS-CoV-2 Delta variant becomes the dominant strain of COVID-19 in the United States.
    - COVID-19 vaccines – Moderna seeks full approval from the FDA for the Moderna COVID-19 vaccine.
    - Michigan lifts several face mask requirements at outdoor gatherings and loosens them at indoor gatherings and businesses. Fully vaccinated people are allowed to not wear masks in public, but unvaccinated and partially vaccinated people are still required to do so.
- June 2 – Paul Allard Hodgkins, a Tampa man who was seen in the U.S. Senate chamber during the January 6 riot at the United States Capitol, pleads guilty, making him the second suspect to do so after Jon Schaffer.
- June 3 – The FBI announces that it has opened an investigation into Postmaster General Louis DeJoy over campaign fundraising.
- June 4
  - Facebook's Oversight Board announces its ban on former President Donald Trump's personal account will last until January 2023. Trump was originally banned for posting a message supporting the January 6 insurrectionists. It also announces that it will no longer grant blanket immunity to politicians who use its service, especially if their posts are deemed to be deceptive or abusive.
  - District Judge Roger Benitez overturns California's ban on assault weapons.
  - A letter to Apple's Tim Cook is made public, in which staff request more flexibility over remote work, following the company's decision to return its 150,000 employees to the office.
  - The FDA approves the first new medication since 2014, semaglutide (Wegovy), for chronic weight management.
- June 5 – Aftermath of the January 6 United States Capitol attack – The Department of Justice says that over 465 people have been arrested since the January 6 attack. It is also seeking information on 250 other suspects.
- June 6
  - Aftermath of the January 6 United States Capitol attack – Rep. Eric Swalwell (D–CA) announces he sued Mo Brooks (R–AL) for being responsible for inciting January 6.
  - COVID-19 vaccination in the United States: The U.S. surpasses 300 million COVID-19 vaccine doses administered.
  - Floyd Mayweather fights in an exhibition bout against YouTuber Logan Paul.
  - The United States defeats Mexico 3–2 after extra time in the final to become the first champions of the CONCACAF Nations League.
- June 7
  - Twitter suspensions: Twitter announces that they have suspended the account of former Florida Department of Health dashboard manager Rebekah Jones for spamming and "platform manipulation" after she paid other users to follow her.
  - Aducanumab (Aduhelm), the first new medication for Alzheimer's disease in 20 years, is approved by the FDA.
  - Vice President Kamala Harris visits Guatemala, making it her first oversees trip as vice president. She urges migrants not to come to the United States–Mexico border.
- June 9 – President Biden visits the United Kingdom for the 2021 G7 summit, his first international trip as president. Biden also signs the New Atlantic Charter with British Prime Minister Boris Johnson, attends the 2021 Brussels summit with leaders of NATO countries, and meets with Russian President Vladimir Putin in Geneva, Switzerland the next week.
- June 10 – The Maine Legislature passes a law mandating the state government completely divest from fossil fuel by 2026. If signed into law, Maine will be the first state to divest from the fossil fuel industry.
- June 12 – COVID-19 misinformation: YouTube announces that it has suspended U.S. Senator Ron Johnson (R–WI) for violating their policies about promoting unproven alternative therapies to treat COVID-19.
- June 11–13 – List of mass shootings in the United States in 2021 – At least 10 people are killed and another 50 are injured in nine mass shootings in six states.
- June 14
  - American intelligence specialist Reality Winner, who was convicted in 2018 for leaking an NSA report on Russian interference in the 2016 United States elections to news site The Intercept, is released from prison.
  - COVID-19 pandemic
    - Hawaii reports their first case of the Lineage B.1.617 Delta variant in an Oahu resident who traveled to Nevada.
    - Vermont Governor Phil Scott announces that 80% of individuals in his state have received a dose of the COVID-19 vaccine, becoming the first U.S. state to do so. Following the milestone, Scott announced that the state would lift their restrictions.
- June 15
  - COVID-19 pandemic
    - California authorities remove the mask mandate for outdoor activities.
    - The nationwide death toll from the virus exceeds 600,000, equal to the annual cancer death toll.
- June 16 – Texas Governor Greg Abbott signs Texas House Bill 1927, eliminating the requirement for Texas residents to obtain a license to carry handguns either concealed or openly starting September 1, 2021.
- June 17
  - Politico obtains a recording of William Braddock, GOP candidate in a Florida congressional seat, threatening to send "a Russian and Ukrainian hit squad" to fellow Republican opponent Anna Paulina Luna to make her "disappear."
  - The House votes, by 268 to 161, to repeal the Authorization for Use of Military Force Against Iraq Resolution of 2002.
  - President Biden signs a bill making Juneteenth an official federal holiday.
- June 18 – 2021 NBA playoffs: The Los Angeles Clippers advance to their first NBA Conference Finals after a 131–119 victory against the Utah Jazz in game 6, in which they will play the Phoenix Suns.
- June 19
  - COVID-19 pandemic: Indiana reports its first case of the Delta variant of COVID-19.
  - The first Juneteenth under federal holiday status is celebrated.
- June 20
  - 2021 Arizona wildfires – An outbreak of wildfires begins in Arizona due to thunderstorms producing dry lightning coming through the state from June 14 to June 20. Due to the outbreak, as well as fire danger, many national forests in the state of Arizona are closed to the public. The only people allowed in the forests are firefighters and people who own property in the forests.
  - 2021 Atlantic hurricane season – Thirteen people are killed in Alabama during Tropical Storm Claudette. Ten of the victims die in a single car crash, nine of whom are children.
  - An EF3 tornado strikes the Illinois cities of Naperville, Woodridge, and Darien, destroying 12 homes, damaging an additional 100, and injuring six people.
- June 21
  - Las Vegas Raiders defensive end Carl Nassib becomes the first National Football League player to come out as openly gay.
  - Minnesota Vikings defensive tackle Jaylen Twyman is shot along with three others while visiting his aunt in Washington, D.C.
- June 22
  - 2021 New York City mayoral election – Residents of New York City elect a new mayor. This is the first time that a New York City election is determined using rank-choice (instant-runoff) voting.
  - 2021 Buffalo mayoral election – Community activist and self-avowed socialist India Walton defeats incumbent mayor Byron Brown to win the Democratic primary. As the Democratic candidate is overwhelmingly favored to win the mayoralship in November, this will possibly be the first time that a socialist will be mayor of a major American city since 1960.
  - COVID-19 pandemic: Michigan lifts its face mask requirements and capacity restrictions on indoor events. Masks are still required for nursing homes, prisons, hospitals, schools, funeral directors, and agricultural workers. Usage at businesses is optional.
- June 23 – COVID-19 pandemic – Washington reports their first case of the Lineage P.1 Gamma variant in an unvaccinated Clallam County resident who traveled out of the state.
- June 24
  - Surfside condominium building collapse – A 12-story condominium apartment building in Surfside, Florida partially collapses. At the official end of search on July 23, the death toll is 97, with one further person unaccounted for.
  - A pedestrian bridge on Interstate 295 collapses in northeastern Washington, D.C., injuring five.
  - Infrastructure policy of the Joe Biden administration: President Biden announces that he has reached a bipartisan infrastructure deal with Senators.
  - Aftermath of the January 6 United States Capitol attack – Over 500 suspects have been arrested since the Capitol riot. U.S. Attorney General Merrick Garland announces that the first suspect is arrested for assaulting media during the events of January 6.
  - The Appellate Division of the New York Supreme Court suspends former New York City Mayor Rudy Giuliani from practicing law over his false claims about the 2020 election.
  - Microsoft unveils Windows 11, the latest generation of its computer operating system.
  - The Federal Aviation Administration approves a request to rename McCarran International Airport in Las Vegas, currently the seventh-busiest airport by passenger traffic in the United States, to Harry Reid International Airport.
- June 25
  - Defending Stanley Cup champion Tampa Bay Lightning advance to the Stanley Cup Finals to face the Montreal Canadiens.
  - Former police officer Derek Chauvin is sentenced to 22.5 years in prison for the murder of George Floyd in Minneapolis in May 2020.
- June 26
  - COVID-19 pandemic – Michigan reports its first case of Lineage B.1.617 Delta variant in a fully vaccinated Ottawa County resident.
  - In Southeast Michigan, a rainband sets up across Washtenaw County and Wayne County. The local weather radar estimated that some areas in Detroit received 6 in (150 mm) of rain. Local highways like I-75, I-94, and I-96 were flooded, and hundreds of cars were left stranded.
  - 2021 Albuquerque hot air balloon crash – Five people are killed when a hot air balloon crashes into power lines in Albuquerque, New Mexico.
- June 26–29 – Portland, Oregon experiences a 3-day heat wave, which kills 93 people.
- June 29
  - Recreational cannabis becomes legal in New Mexico.
  - San Jose becomes the first city in the nation to mandate that gun owners both purchase liability insurance for their firearms and to pay an annual fee to cover costs to the city's services for gun-related injuries and deaths, after the city council unanimously adopted the measures.
- June 30
  - Disgraced entertainer Bill Cosby is prematurely released from prison when the Pennsylvania Supreme Court overturns his sexual assault convictions and sentences on the grounds that his due process rights were violated. In addition to this, the highest judiciary within the Commonwealth of Pennsylvania bars any future prosecution for these crimes.
  - A grand jury in Manhattan indicts the Trump organization, as well as CFO Allen Weisselberg.
  - An intentional controlled detonation of illegal fireworks by the Los Angeles Police Department in a busy neighborhood of South Los Angeles does not go as planned, injuring seventeen people, including 10 LAPD officers, and damaging windows, cars, and buildings.

=== July ===
- July 1
  - Recreational cannabis becomes legal in Connecticut and Virginia.
  - Medical cannabis becomes legal in South Dakota.
  - COVID-19 vaccination – Michigan Governor Gretchen Whitmer announces a month-long vaccination raffle in which residents can win a total of $5 million in cash (one grand prize of $2 million or three prizes of $1 million) and $500,000 total in college scholarships for children ages 12–17 years old (nine prizes of $55,000). The winners were drawn on August 4.
- July 2 – Hundreds of businesses are hit by a large-scale cyberattack, linked to the Russian REvil ransomware gang.
- July 2–5 – At least 233 people were killed and 618 people were injured in over 500 shootings nationwide during the Independence Day weekend.
- July 6 – 2021 New York City mayoral election – Eric Adams was declared the winner of the Democratic primary for mayor of New York City.
- July 7 – The Tampa Bay Lightning defeat the Montreal Canadiens (4-1) in the 2021 Stanley Cup Finals to win their second consecutive Stanley Cup.
- July 8 – Attorney Michael Avenatti is sentenced to 2.5 years in prison for attempting to extort Nike.
- July 9
  - Twitter suspensions – Twitter announces that they have suspended political commentator and nationalist Nick Fuentes.
  - President Biden signs a 72-point executive order placing tighter regulations and scrutiny on major corporations in a variety of sectors, including Big Tech companies. Policies outlined include banning non-compete clauses, curbing the ability of manufacturers to restrict the right to repair certain products, granting the Federal Trade Commission the ability to set guidelines on data collection, banning unfair competition practices in online marketplaces, and ordering the Food and Drug Administration to work with states and Native American tribes on procuring cheaper medicines from Canada.
  - Illinois becomes the first state to teach history about Asian Americans in public schools.
- July 11–13 – The 2021 Major League Baseball First-Year Player Draft was held in Denver. Henry Davis was selected first overall by the Pittsburgh Pirates.
- July 12
  - Actor Drake Bell is sentenced to two years of probation for child endangerment.
  - Ghislaine Maxwell, the long-time friend and partner of Jeffrey Epstein, appears in court in relation to allegations of sex trafficking.
- July 13 – The American League defeat the National League (5–2) in the 2021 MLB All-Star Game.
- July 16 – Michael Gargiulo (a.k.a. the Hollywood Ripper) is sentenced to death for two murders.
- July 17 – A shooting occurs outside of Nationals Park during a game between the San Diego Padres and the Washington Nationals during the sixth inning, causing the game to get postponed until Sunday.
- July 19 – Fox News host Sean Hannity urges viewers to take the threat of COVID-19 seriously, as well as urging viewers to receive the COVID-19 vaccine.
- July 20
  - Blue Origin NS-16: On the 52nd anniversary of the Apollo 11 Moon landing, Jeff Bezos successfully launches the Blue Origin rocket New Shepard 4 in Van Horn, Texas, carrying himself, his brother Mark, 82-year-old retired pilot Wally Funk, and 18-year-old college student Oliver Daemen. The rocket lands back on Earth within minutes, completing the first crewed spaceflight with reusable rockets.
  - Tom Barrack, founder of Colony Capital and an advisor of Donald Trump, is indicted for making false statements to the FBI and being an unregistered agent for the United Arab Emirates. He is found not guilty in 2022.
  - The Milwaukee Bucks defeat the Phoenix Suns (4–2) in the 2021 NBA Finals to win their first championship since 1971.
- July 21
  - The 2021 NHL expansion draft is held at Gas Works Park in Seattle, where the 32nd NHL team, the Seattle Kraken fills out its first ever roster of players.
  - Santa Monica based video game publisher Activision Blizzard, Inc. is hit with a massive lawsuit from the California Department of Fair Employment and Housing after a two-year investigation reveals a "frat boy" like work environment where female employees face sexual harassment, discrimination, and retaliation for speaking out against the company.
  - The Tennessee State Building Commission announces that the statue of Nathan Bedford Forrest will be moved from the Tennessee State Capitol to the Tennessee State Museum.
  - The Missouri Supreme Court unanimously upholds a 2020 amendment to the state's constitution that expanded Medicaid eligibility.
- July 22 – After Sherman Packard strips Lynne Ober of her committee leadership position, Lynne and her husband Russell resign from the New Hampshire House of Representatives in protest.
- July 23 – Cleveland's Major League Baseball team announces that they will change their name from the Indians to the Guardians, resolving a decades-long controversy.
- July 23–August 8 – The United States compete at the Summer Olympics in Tokyo, Japan and win 39 gold, 41 silver, and 33 bronze medals.
- July 25 – 2020 Summer Olympics: American fencer Lee Kiefer wins a gold medal at the women's foil event for fencing, making her the first American woman to do so. Additionally, Anastasija Zolotic becomes the first American woman to win a gold medal in taekwondo.
- July 27
  - A runoff election is held in Texas to fill a vacancy in its 6th congressional district due to the death of Ron Wright on February 7. Republican Jake Ellzey wins with 20,837 of the 39,116 votes cast (53.27%).
  - Whatcom County, Washington becomes the first state county to ban new fossil fuel infrastructure. The new law also places restrictions on existing fossil fuel facilities, such as a requirement that any greenhouse gases emitted from expansion be offset.
- July 28
  - The Senate votes 67–32 to advance the Infrastructure Investment and Jobs Act, a bipartisan $1.2 trillion infrastructure bill.
  - Swimming at the 2020 Summer Olympics: Florida swimmer Bobby Finke becomes the first American to win a gold medal at the 800 metre freestyle event at the Olympics.
- July 29
  - Trevor Milton, billionaire and founder of the Nikola electric truck startup, is indicted on three counts of fraud.
  - Suni Lee wins a gold medal in the gymnastics all-around competition, making her the first Asian American to win a gold medal in gymnastics during the Olympics.
  - COVID-19 vaccination: Vermont becomes the first U.S. state to vaccinate 70% of children aged 12 to 17 years old.
- July 30
  - The Senate votes 66–28 to allow debates to begin on the Infrastructure Investment and Jobs Act.
  - Tax returns of Donald Trump: The Department of Justice rules that the U.S. Treasury must hand the tax returns of former President Donald Trump to Congress.
  - Swimming at the 2020 Summer Olympics: Caeleb Dressel breaks a world record in the 100m butterfly during the Olympics, finishing in 49.45 seconds.
- July 31
  - Florida swimmer Bobby Finke wins a gold medal at the 1500 metre freestyle event at the Olympics, becoming the first American to do so since Mike O'Brien.
  - COVID-19 pandemic: Florida reports 21,683 cases of COVID-19, a new single-day record.

=== August ===
- August 2
  - COVID-19 pandemic
    - COVID-19 vaccination: Over 70% of adults are reported to have received at least one dose of a COVID-19 vaccine.
    - U.S. Senator Lindsey Graham announces that he has tested positive for COVID-19, despite receiving the COVID-19 vaccine.
- August 3
  - COVID-19 vaccination: New York City mandates vaccines for indoor dining, gyms, and performances, becoming the first U.S. city to do so.
  - A report released by New York Attorney General Letitia James says that Governor Andrew Cuomo sexually harassed 11 women.
- August 4
  - Magistrate Judge N. Reid Neureiter of Colorado announces that two lawyers, Gary D. Fielder and Ernest John Walker, will be sanctioned for filing a lawsuit challenging the results of the 2020 election.
  - COVID-19 pandemic: Louisiana reports 2,247 hospitalizations, a new single-day record.
- August 5 – President Biden sets a goal for half of new cars sold to be zero-emission by 2030.
- August 6
  - COVID-19 pandemic
    - COVID-19 vaccination: The CDC reports that 50% of the U.S. population (including both adults and children) is now fully vaccinated, or about 166 million people.
    - Florida reports 22,783 new cases of COVID-19, a new single-day record.
  - Aftermath of the January 6 United States Capitol attack: New Jersey gym owner Scott K. Fairlamb and Washington resident Devlyn D. Thompson pleads guilty to assaulting U.S. Capitol Police officers during the Capitol riot, becoming the first suspects to do so.
  - Karate at the 2020 Summer Olympics: American karateka Ariel Torres wins a bronze medal in the men's kata event, winning the first United States medal in karate.
  - 2021 California fire season: The Dixie Fire near Chico becomes the largest fire in the history of California.
- August 8
  - Volleyball at the 2020 Summer Olympics – Women's tournament: The United States defeats the two time reigning Olympic Champions Brazil. Becoming the first to win Gold in Tokyo.
- August 9
  - COVID-19 pandemic
    - COVID-19 vaccination
      - Secretary of Defense Lloyd Austin announces that all service members will be required to get vaccinated by mid September.
      - The CDC announces that 60% of Americans have received their first dose of the COVID-19 vaccine.
- August 10
  - New York Governor Andrew Cuomo announces he will resign effective August 24 after an inquiry found he sexually harassed multiple women.
  - The Senate votes 69–30 to pass the Infrastructure Investment and Jobs Act, a $1.2 trillion bipartisan infrastructure bill.
  - Dominion Voting Systems sues conservative news channels One America News Network and Newsmax, plus former Overstock.com CEO Patrick M. Byrne, claiming they promoted false conspiracy theories about them after the 2020 presidential election.
- August 11
  - Aubrey de Grey, a leading anti-aging researcher and Chief Science Officer of the SENS Research Foundation, is placed on leave by his company, following sexual harassment allegations by two women in the field.
  - The Senate votes to pass a $3.5 trillion reconciliation package, a day after the bipartisan infrastructure package passed.
  - The Senate votes unanimously to confirm former Interior Secretary Ken Salazar as U.S. Ambassador to Mexico, making him the first of Biden's Ambassador nominees to be confirmed.
- August 12 – The Census Bureau reports that, per the results of the 2020 census, the population of White Americans declined for the first time in history, and population growth is at its lowest since the Great Depression. Conversely, Hispanic, Asian, and Multiracial Americans saw the largest growth, with the latter seeing an increase of 276%. Hispanics make up the largest group in California for the first time, with whites in Texas barely remaining the largest by 0.4%. The Southern and Western regions also saw the most growth.
- August 13
  - COVID-19 pandemic
    - Michigan surpasses 20,000 deaths from COVID-19.
    - In Texas, multiple appeal courts uphold the mask mandates imposed in Bexar, Dallas, Harris, and Travis counties in an effort to override Governor Greg Abbott's ban on them in schools.
  - The New York State Assembly says that it will not impeach Governor Andrew Cuomo following his announcement that he would resign.
  - Bob Dylan is accused of sexual assault and related offenses in 1965 by a woman identified as "J.C." who files a lawsuit against the singer. Dylan denies the allegations.
- August 14
  - President Biden authorizes 5,000 U.S. troops to be deployed in Afghanistan, as the Taliban seize all regional capitals except Kabul.
  - Texas Governor Greg Abbott tests positive for COVID-19. His office says he is fully vaccinated.
  - Colorado Governor Jared Polis rescinds two proclamations dating from the 1860s that authorized settlers to kill "hostile Indians", which lead to the Sand Creek massacre.
- August 18 – R&B singer R. Kelly begins his trial at New York's Eastern District federal court, accused of racketeering, sexual abuse and bribery, all of which he denies.
- August 19
  - The Library of Congress, U.S. Supreme Court, U.S. Capitol, and nearby congressional offices in Washington, D.C. are evacuated due to a bomb threat by the driver of a suspicious vehicle.
  - Times Square in New York is evacuated due to a suspicious package.
- August 20 – The Alameda County Superior Court rules that California Proposition 22 (2020), which exempts app-based transportation and delivery companies like Uber and DoorDash from having to classify their workers as employees, is unconstitutional. The defendants, consisting of a coalition of gig economy companies, say they will appeal.
- August 22 – Antifa and the Proud Boys clash at an abandoned Kmart in Portland, Oregon.
- August 23 – COVID-19 vaccination: The FDA gives approval to the Pfizer–BioNTech COVID-19 vaccine (Comirnaty) for those aged 16 years and older.
- August 24
  - The U.S. Supreme Court restores the Trump-era Remain in Mexico policy, which requires migrants seeking asylum to remain in Mexico until their US immigration court date.
  - New York Governor Andrew Cuomo's resignation becomes official at midnight and Kathy Hochul becomes the first female New York Governor.
- August 25 – U.S. District Judge Linda Vivienne Parker announces sanctions against Sidney Powell, L. Lin Wood, and other lawyers who were filing a lawsuit seeking to overturn President Biden's victory in Michigan last year. She also orders the lawyers to be referred to their home states for disbarment or suspension of law license.
- August 26 – Operation Allies Refuge: President Biden, in an address to the nation, says that the evacuation of American citizens will continue despite the terrorist attacks. He also vows that the U.S. will avenge the deaths of the 13 service members killed in the attacks by "hunting down" those responsible and "making them pay".
- August 29
  - Hurricane Ida makes landfall at 11:55am CDT near Port Fourchon, Louisiana, on the 16th anniversary of Hurricane Katrina.
  - In high school football, Bishop Sycamore loses to IMG Academy, 58–0, at the Tom Benson Hall of Fame Stadium in Canton, Ohio, which is aired on ESPN. Following the game, the existence of Bishop Sycamore is questioned by fans and the school is accused of running a grift and duping ESPN into airing the game.
- August 30 – Operation Allies Refuge: The United States withdraws its remaining 2,500 troops from Afghanistan, ending its 20-year involvement in the War in Afghanistan.

=== September ===
- September 1
  - Texas implements the "Heartbeat Act" banning abortions after six weeks of pregnancy.
  - Texas residents are allowed to carry handguns without a license or training.
  - Aftermath of the January 6 United States Capitol attack: The Department of Justice secures its 50th guilty plea in its criminal investigation of the January 6 riot at the Capitol.
  - A state of emergency is declared in New York City after record rainfall and flash flooding shuts down much of the city's transportation system, caused by Tropical Storm Ida.
- September 2
  - Hurricane Ida
    - More than 54 deaths are reported in New York and the wider northeastern United States amid the ongoing flood emergency, as rescuers continue to search for stranded people.
    - The Vine Street Expressway in Philadelphia is closed due to massive flooding on portions of the highway. The Park Towne Place residential complex is also evacuated due to flooding.
- September 3
  - Jake Angeli, the so-called "QAnon Shaman" pleads guilty to obstructing a proceeding of Congress during the January 6 attack.
  - Texas Heartbeat Act: Texas state judge Guerra Gamble blocks the Texas Right To Life from suing Planned Parenthood under the pretext of the abortion law.
- September 8 – The Robert E. Lee Monument on Monument Avenue in Richmond, Virginia, a statue of Confederate General Robert E. Lee, is removed.
- September 9
  - COVID-19 vaccination in the United States: President Biden issues new federal vaccine requirements affecting up to 100 million Americans. All employers with more than 100 workers are required to be either vaccinated or test for the virus weekly, while 17 million workers at health facilities that receive federal Medicare or Medicaid are ordered to be fully vaccinated.
  - Texas Governor Greg Abbott signs a bill that prohibits social media sites from banning or restricting users based on "the viewpoint of the user or another person", whether or not that viewpoint is expressed on the social media platform itself.
- September 10 – Trump–Ukraine scandal: Former Rudy Giuliani associate Igor Fruman pleads guilty to one count of soliciting a contribution by a foreign national.
- September 11
  - Commemorations take place around the country to mark the 20th anniversary of the September 11 attacks. A minute's silence is held at the World Trade Center site at the exact time each hijacked plane crashed.
  - British tennis player Emma Raducanu defeats Canadian Leylah Fernandez in the Women's singles US Open with a score of 6–4, 6–3, becoming the first player in the Open Era to win a major tournament after coming through qualifiers.
- September 13 – COVID-19 pandemic in New York: In New York City, schools reopen to one million children for the first time since the start of the pandemic in March 2020.
- September 14 – A recall election is held in California on whether Governor Gavin Newsom should remain in office, and who his successor should be if he is voted out. Newsom defeats the recall and remains in office.
- September 16 – Inspiration4, launched by SpaceX, becomes the first all-civilian spaceflight, carrying a four-person crew on a three-day orbit of the Earth.
- September 20
  - Trump Organization CFO Allen Weisselberg makes an appearance at the New York Supreme Court as prosecutors continue their investigation into former President Trump's business dealings.
  - The death toll from the COVID-19 pandemic surpasses that of the 1918 Spanish flu pandemic, becoming the deadliest disease outbreak in American history.
- September 21
  - President Biden delivers his first speech at the United Nations General Assembly.
  - Michigan Governor Gretchen Whitmer announces that Michigan will build an electrified road to charge electric vehicles, becoming the first U.S. state to do so.
- September 22 – COVID-19 pandemic – Michigan surpasses one million confirmed cases of COVID-19.
- September 23
  - A man shoots 13 people then kills himself in Collierville, Tennessee.
  - 2020 United States presidential election in Arizona: A months-long recount of 2.1 million ballots cast in Maricopa County, Arizona, confirms in a draft report that Joe Biden won that state's 11 electoral votes, with no mass voter fraud designed to "steal" the election from former President Donald Trump.
  - Aftermath of the January 6 United States Capitol attack: – The January 6 House Committee issues its first subpoenas, which mandate that four advisors and associates to former President Donald Trump turn over records and testimony. The targets of the subpoenas are former White House Chief of Staff Mark Meadows, former White House Deputy Chief of Staff for Communications Dan Scavino, former Defense Department official Kashyap Patel and former Trump adviser Steve Bannon.
- September 24
  - The U.S. House votes to pass the Women's Health Protection Act, an abortion rights bill, in response to the Supreme Court refusing to block the Texas Heartbeat Act from becoming law.
  - Fox News announces that it has banned Rudy Giuliani and his son Andrew Giuliani from appearing on the channel for three months.
- September 25 – A train derails in Montana, killing three people.
- September 26 – 2021 NFL season: Baltimore Ravens kicker Justin Tucker kicks a 66-yard field goal during the team's 19–17 victory against the Detroit Lions, making it the longest field goal in National Football League history.
- September 27
  - COVID-19 pandemic
    - COVID-19 vaccination
      - In Vermont, registration opens to people aged 75 years and older to receive the booster shot of the Pfizer–BioNTech COVID-19 vaccine.
      - In Washington, D.C., President Biden receives his third dose of the COVID-19 vaccine.
  - Grammy Award-winning singer R. Kelly is found guilty in a federal court on all counts of sexually abusing women and children over two decades.
  - Ford announces an $11.4 billion plan for electric vehicle (EV) production, its largest ever investment in the US, with a major new factory in Tennessee and two battery parks in Kentucky creating nearly 11,000 jobs.
- September 29 – The U.S. Fish and Wildlife Service declares 23 species extinct, due to a combination of development, invasive species, logging and pollution.
- September 30
  - Britney Spears' father Jamie Spears is formally suspended as the conservator of her estate.
  - President Biden signs legislation that would extend funding for the U.S. government through December 3, thereby avoiding a government shutdown. Government funds were due to run out at midnight.

=== October ===
- October 1 – The Supreme Court announces that Brett Kavanaugh has tested positive for COVID-19.
- October 3
  - A massive oil spill occurs off the coast of Huntington Beach, California, prompting many beach closures, and washing up dead birds and fish.
  - 2021 NFL season – Tom Brady becomes the fourth quarterback to defeat all 32 National Football League teams following the Tampa Bay Buccaneers 19–17 victory against his former team, the New England Patriots. He also surpasses Drew Brees as the NFL's all-time leading passer.
- October 5
  - Windows 11 is launched by Microsoft.
  - The president of the Sergeants Benevolent Association, a police union representing the sergeants in the New York City Police Department, resigns following an FBI raid on his Long Island home.
  - The U.S. Senate confirms Damian Williams as Attorney for the Southern District of New York, making him the first African American to lead the office.
- October 6
  - Case Breakers, a group of former law enforcement individuals, claim to have identified the Zodiac Killer as Gary Francis Poste, an individual who died in 2018.
  - Federal judge Robert L. Pitman blocks the Texas Heartbeat Act from being enforced for a short temporary period.
- October 7
  - The U.S. Senate votes 61–38 to overcome a filibuster and 50–48 to increase the federal debt.
  - Eighteen former NBA players are charged with healthcare fraud, including Terrence Williams, Tony Allen, Shannon Brown, and Ronald Glen Davis.
  - Ghosts based on the British sitcom of the same name premieres on CBS.
- October 11
  - The 2021 Boston Marathon takes place after it was rescheduled from April.
  - 2021 Las Vegas Raiders season: Las Vegas Raiders head coach Jon Gruden resigns after several e-mails between him and Bruce Allen containing racist, sexist, homophobic, and trans-phobic remarks are leaked by The New York Times.
  - Amazon CEO Andy Jassy announces that the company will drop its return-to-office plan and allow its corporate employees to continue working remotely if they choose.
- October 13 – Star Trek actor William Shatner becomes the oldest person to go into space, at age 90, on board the Blue Origin NS-18, launched from Texas.
- October 18
  - 2021–22 NHL season: San Jose Sharks forward Evander Kane is suspended for 21 games for submitting a forged COVID-19 vaccination card.
  - Murder of Ahmaud Arbery: The state trial of Travis McMichael, his father Gregory McMichael, and William "Roddie" Bryan begins in Georgia.
- October 19
  - The January 6 select committee investigating the riot on the U.S. Capitol votes to hold former Donald Trump White House Chief Strategist Steve Bannon in criminal contempt for refusing to comply with a subpoena issued by the select committee.
  - The United States Department of Justice announces that U.S. Rep. Jeff Fortenberry has been indicted for making false statements to federal authorities.
  - The FBI announces that it has raided the house of Russian oligarch and Vladimir Putin ally Oleg Deripaska, who was sanctioned by the U.S. Treasury Department in 2018.
- October 20 – The district attorney of Westchester County announces a criminal investigation into The Trump Organization.
- October 21 – Rust shooting incident: Film producer Alec Baldwin fatally shoots Halyna Hutchins and wounds Joel Souza during the filming of Rust, when a prop firearm is discharged by accident.
- October 22 – Trump–Ukraine scandal: Former Rudy Giuliani associate Lev Parnas is convicted by the SDNY for campaign financing crimes and for illegally funding foreign cash to Republicans during the 2018 midterms. The conviction is announced by Attorney Damian Williams.
- October 23 – 2021 NCAA Division I FBS football season: In college football, the Illinois Fighting Illini defeats Penn State 20-18 in nine overtimes, making it the longest football game played in NCAA history.
- October 26 – A report comes out revealing that former Chicago Blackhawks coach Brad Aldrich sexually assaulted Kyle Beach, a young prospect on the team during the 2009–10 NHL season. The report also shows that Stan Bowman, Kevin Cheveldayoff, and Joel Quenneville met before the 2010 Stanley Cup Finals and allowed Aldrich to continue working until the end of the season.
- October 28 – Mark Zuckerberg announces that Facebook, Inc., owner of Facebook, Instagram, WhatsApp and Oculus, will rebrand itself as Meta Platforms.
- October 29
  - MrBeast and Mark Rober launch #TeamSeas, a project to clean up 30 million pounds of ocean trash by the end of the year.
  - The U.S. Food and Drug Administration authorizes the emergency use of the Pfizer-BioNTech COVID-19 vaccine for children 5 through 11 years of age.

=== November ===
- November 1
  - The U.S. Supreme Court begins its arguments about the Texas Heartbeat Act.
  - Kenosha unrest shooting: The trial of Kyle Rittenhouse begins in Kenosha.
- November 2
  - New Jersey and Virginia gubernatorial elections are held. Republican Glenn Youngkin wins the Virginia race, while Democrat Phil Murphy wins re-election in the New Jersey race.
  - Republican Winsome Sears wins the Virginia lieutenant governor's race and will become the first black and first female lieutenant governor of the state of Virginia.
  - A special election is held in Ohio to fill a vacancy in its 11th congressional district left by Marcia Fudge when she resigned to become President Biden's Secretary of Housing and Urban Development. Democrat Shontel Brown wins with 81,636 of the 103,565 votes cast (78.8%).
  - Another special election is held in Ohio to fill a vacancy in its 15th congressional district due to the resignation of Steve Stivers effective May 15 to become president and CEO of the Ohio Chamber of Commerce. Republican Mike Carey wins with 93,255 of the 160,012 votes cast (58.3%).
  - The Atlanta Braves win the 2021 World Series, defeating the Houston Astros.
  - Las Vegas Raiders wide receiver Henry Ruggs III is involved in an automobile accident where a 23-year-old woman is killed. At the time of the crash, Ruggs was driving 120 mph (190 km/h). He was also over double the legal intoxication level as well. The Raiders immediately cut him later that day.
- November 3
  - COVID-19 pandemic: In Wisconsin, Green Bay Packers quarterback Aaron Rodgers tests positive for COVID-19 and will miss the team's matchup against the Kansas City Chiefs.
  - Smartmatic announces that they have sued conservative news channels One America News Network and Newsmax for defamation and false claims about their voting machines during the 2020 election.
- November 4
  - An investigatory hearing is held by the State Bar of Texas to kick off a multi-start process that would decide the fate of attorney Sidney Powell, who spread conspiracy claims after the 2020 presidential election.
  - The National Basketball Association announces that they have launched an investigation into Phoenix Suns owner Robert Sarver over allegations of sexism and racism.
- November 5
  - The U.S. House of Representatives votes 228–206 to pass the Infrastructure Investment and Jobs Act, a US$1.2 trillion infrastructure package.
  - A crowd crush during a Travis Scott concert at the Astroworld Festival in Houston kills ten people and injures more than 300.
- November 7 – Alabama native Nimblewill Nomad becomes the oldest person to hike on the Appalachian Trail.
- November 8
  - On October 15, the White House announced that it would reopen international borders to non-essential travel from the EU, UK, China, India, South Africa, Iran and Brazil on November 8. The travel restrictions have been in place for 18 months, coming into effect in the early days of the pandemic.
  - Dominion Voting Systems announces that they have sued Fox Corporation and Fox Broadcasting Company, the parent company of Fox News, for defamation and for failing to preserve documents relating to the role Rupert Murdoch played in spreading false claims about Dominion.
- November 9 – The South Dakota Legislature votes to consider the impeachment of Attorney General Jason Ravnsborg.
- November 11 – Vice President Harris travels to Paris to deliver a speech at the Paris Peace Forum.
- November 12 – United States Attorney General Merrick Garland announces that former White House Chief Strategist Steve Bannon has been charged by the Department of Justice for refusing to testify to the January 6 select committee investigating the Capitol riot and refusing to provide documents requested by the committee. Bannon turned himself in to the FBI three days later.
- November 13 – While speaking before a "ReAwaken America" audience in November 2021, Former Trump National Security Advisor Michael Flynn said, "If we are going to have one nation under God, which we must, we have to have one religion. One nation under God, and one religion under God." causing some outrage.
- November 15
  - Radio host and conspiracy theorist Alex Jones is found liable for damages in lawsuits brought by parents of children killed in the Sandy Hook elementary school shooting, over Jones's false claim the massacre was a hoax.
  - President Biden signs the Infrastructure Investment and Jobs Act into law.
- November 16 – Maryland reports their first case of monkeypox in a resident who traveled from Nigeria.
- November 17 – The U.S. House of Representatives votes 222–208 to censure Rep. Paul Gosar (R–AZ) after he posted a photo-shopped anime clip of him killing Rep. Alexandria Ocasio-Cortez (D–NY) and threatening President Biden, making him the first lawmaker to be censured since Charlie Rangel in 2010.
- November 19
  - Vice President Harris serves as acting president from 10:10 am to 11:35 am EST, while President Biden undergoes a colonoscopy under anesthesia.
  - The U.S. House of Representatives votes 220–213 to pass the Build Back Better Act, a US$1.75 trillion social and climate spending package.
  - State of Wisconsin v Kyle Rittenhouse: Mr. Rittenhouse is found not guilty on five charges of attempted murder, after three weeks of debate, and three days of jury deliberation.
- November 21 – Waukesha Christmas parade attack: An SUV is driven through the annual Christmas parade in Waukesha, Wisconsin, killing six people and injuring 62 others. The alleged driver of the vehicle, 39-year-old Darrell E. Brooks, is arrested and charged with five counts of murder.
- November 23 – The Biden administration announces a release of 50 million oil barrels from the Strategic Petroleum Reserve to bring down inflation in conjunction with other countries' efforts, the largest release in history. An investigation into oil companies' practices is also announced.
- November 24
  - NASA launches the Double Asteroid Redirection Test (DART), the first attempt to deflect an asteroid for the purpose of learning how to protect Earth.
  - All three defendants are found guilty of the murder of Ahmaud Arbery.
- November 29
  - Twitter co-founder Jack Dorsey steps down as its chief executive, saying it is "finally time for me to leave". Parag Agrawal is named his successor.
  - The Attorney General of New York Office releases lengthy documents which prove that CNN host Chris Cuomo abused journalistic ethics in a manner that was much greater than what had been reported earlier in the year. According to the documents, during Andrew Cuomo's sexual harassment scandal, Chris used his connections in the media both to obtain information about his brother's accusers as well as to uncover the possibility that new accusers could come out against the former New York governor.
- November 30
  - Former White House Chief of Staff Mark Meadows announces that he will testify to and cooperate with the January 6 committee.
  - 2021 Oxford High School shooting – Four students are killed and seven other people are injured in a mass shooting at Oxford High School in Oxford Township, Michigan.
  - CNN announces that it has indefinitely suspended Chris Cuomo while a law firm conducts an independent investigation that the network hired to look into the matter.

=== December ===
- December 1 – COVID-19 pandemic: In California, the first case of Omicron variant, a highly mutated variant of COVID-19, is reported by the CDC in a San Francisco resident, who had traveled to South Africa.
- December 2
  - Major League Baseball begins a lockout of its players. It is their first lockout since 1990.
  - COVID-19 pandemic: Minnesota reports their first case of Omicron variant.
  - Two Georgia election officials, Ruby Freeman and Wandrea' ArShaye Moss, file a defamation lawsuit against The Gateway Pundit. The lawsuit is the first to be filed by individual election workers who were targeted during the 2020 presidential election.
- December 4 – Chris Cuomo is fired by CNN for his violations of journalistic ethics by aiding his scandal-ridden brother.
- December 9
  - Workers at a Starbucks in Buffalo, New York vote 19–8 to unionize, becoming the first Starbucks in the country to do so.
  - A virtual summit, Summit for Democracy, was hosted by the United States "to renew democracy at home and confront autocracies abroad".
- December 10 – A late season tornado outbreak occurs in the Southern and Midwestern United States, causing major damage and killing at least 94 people.
- December 11
  - COVID-19 pandemic: North Carolina reports its first case of the Omicron variant in a student at UNC Charlotte.
  - The MLS Cup 2021 hosted in Portland, Oregon, New York City FC defeated Portland Timbers after won 4–2 on penalties (Both teams drew 1–1 in regulation and extra time).
- December 15 – An outbreak of more than 10 wildfires begins in the state of Kansas, scorching an area of more than 163,000 acres (66,000 ha) on the first day they were first reported due to gusty winds and dry grassland. The outbreak leaves the deaths of two people and injures three more.
- December 17 – The Ohio Department of Education concludes their investigation into the Bishop Sycamore High School scandal, labeling the school as a scam.
- December 20 – COVID-19 pandemic: The CDC reports that Deltacron hybrid variant is now pre-dominant strain in the US, which is combined with Delta and Omicron variants, accounting for three-quarters of cases.
- December 29
  - British socialite Ghislaine Maxwell is convicted in a federal court on five of six charges relating to her recruiting and trafficking young girls to be sexually abused by the late financier Jeffrey Epstein.
  - COVID-19 pandemic: The U.S. breaks its single-day case record, with over 488,000 new infections, nearly doubling the highest number from the previous winter.
- December 30 – Tens of thousands are evacuated as wildfires sweep through Boulder County, fanned by winds of up to 105 mph (169 km/h). The fires are the most destructive in Colorado's history.

== See also ==
- 2021 in United States politics and government
- 2021 in American music
- 2021 in American soccer
- 2021 in American television
- List of American films of 2021
