= Nimblewill Nomad =

American sportsman

Meredith J. Eberhart, widely known by his nickname Nimblewill Nomad, is an American perpetual hiker. Eberhart lives in Flagg Mountain, Alabama, and published the 2000 book Ten Million Steps about one of his long-distance hikes.

In November 2021, at age 83, he became the oldest person to hike the entire 2,200 miles (3,540 km) of the Appalachian Trail in a single calendar year, (a record he held until August 2026).

== Biography ==
Eberhart was born in a village in the Ozarks with population of less than 400. He grew up in Russellville, near Jefferson City, Missouri. As a young man, Eberhart attended optometry school, got married, fathered and helped raise two boys, and made a six-figure salary working with cataract patients while living in Titusville, Florida.

After leaving his earlier life in 1998, at age 61, Eberhart became a perpetual walker. In the next 15 years he walked 34,000 miles (55,000 km). He published a book about one of his first hikes, from the Florida Keys to Quebec.

As of January 2018, under an agreement reached between the Alabama Forestry Commission and the Alabama Hiking Trail Society, Eberhart became the official caretaker at a Civilian Conservation Corps (CCC) camp atop Flagg Mountain in Weogufka, in rural Coosa County, Alabama, the southern terminus of the Pinhoti Trail.

Press coverage in early 2019 reported that he had settled on Flagg Mountain, although it was noted that Eberhart had "announced his retirement several times in recent years before surging off on yet another odyssey."

Eberhart aspires to have the Appalachian Trail extended to Flagg Mountain, and has stated that his "purpose in life now … is to promote this remarkable geographic and historic landmark—that it might ultimately become the hub of all to do with hiking and backpacking in the South... [that] those who dream of one day hiking the Appalachians, those folks, all, will think first of Flagg Mountain."

Eberhart has made great contributions in restoring the once dilapidated CCC site.

Eberhart was profiled in several pages of the 2016 book On Trails by environmental journalist Robert Moor, whom he advised to call him "Eb".

== Views ==
During his years of perpetual walking and hiking, Eberhart was quoted in The Guardian as stating:

I tell my friends: every year I've got less and less, and every year I'm a happier man. I just wonder what it's going to be like when I don't have anything. That's the way we come, and that's the way we go. I'm just preparing for that a little in advance, I guess.

Regarding why he has done his long-distance walking, Eberhart said he has "managed to get the answer boiled down to just 32 words":

It's the people, the places, the pain and the trials,
It's the joy and the blessings that come with the miles.
It's a calling going out to a fortunate few,
To wander the fringes of God's hazy blue.

Nimblewill is distressed at the homogenization of trails as they are re-routed away from human habitation, saying:

What joy I had meeting people as I walked the little villages along (Route) 2 (on the International Appalachian Trail). Well, now they've put the trail up on a ridge.... It was one of the most exciting parts of the whole journey, meeting those wonderful people. You can't get that on a ridgetop.

== Book ==
- Eberhart, M. J. (2007). Ten Million Steps: Nimblewill Nomad's epic 10-month trek from the Florida Keys to Quebec (1st trade pbk. ed.). Birmingham, AL: Menasha Ridge Press. ISBN 9780897329798. OCLC 76794741.
- Eberhart, M. J. (2000). Ten million steps (1st ed.). Helena, MT: SkyHouse Pub. ISBN 9781585920396. OCLC 46439935.
