= 2021 Imperial County car crash =

2021 accident in southern California that killed 13 people

Coordinates: 32.83273°N 115.40614°W

Imperial County car crash
- Crash site (southern California) Crash site (California) Crash site (the United States)
- Date: March 2, 2021
- Time: ~6:15 a.m. PST
- Location: Imperial County, California, U.S.
- Deaths: 13
- Injuries: 13

On March 2, 2021, an SUV carrying 25 people collided with a semi-trailer truck in Imperial County, California, U.S., killing 13 people. Investigators said the SUV had entered the United States from Mexico through a hole in a border fence and was smuggling migrants at the time of the crash.

== Background ==
The Ford Expedition, as found at the crash site, had the middle and rear seats removed, and could only safely seat six people despite carrying 25 people.

== Crash ==
In the early morning of March 2, 2021, a red 1997 Ford Expedition carrying 25 passengers and originating from Mexico, having entered the United States through a hole in the border fence, was traveling westbound on Norrish Road in Imperial County, California. It entered an intersection, where a semi-trailer truck travelling north on the other road, State Route 115, crashed into the side of it, killing 13 people and injuring 13. According to authorities, the SUV ran the stop sign and drove in the path of the truck. The occupants of the SUV entered the United States in an unauthorized manner. The truck was carrying gravel cargo, and was owned by a company called Haven & Sons.

== Aftermath ==
The accident closed all lanes in both directions of SR-115, and the National Transportation Safety Board announced an investigation into the crash. The US Department of Homeland Security stated that the vehicle was part of an illegal migrant smuggling operation. In March 2023, Jose Cruz Noguez pled guilty to a charge of conspiracy to bring in undocumented migrants and three counts of bringing in undocumented migrants for financial gain in connection with the crash; he was sentenced to 15 years in prison.
