= Michael Gargiulo =

American serial killer (born 1976)

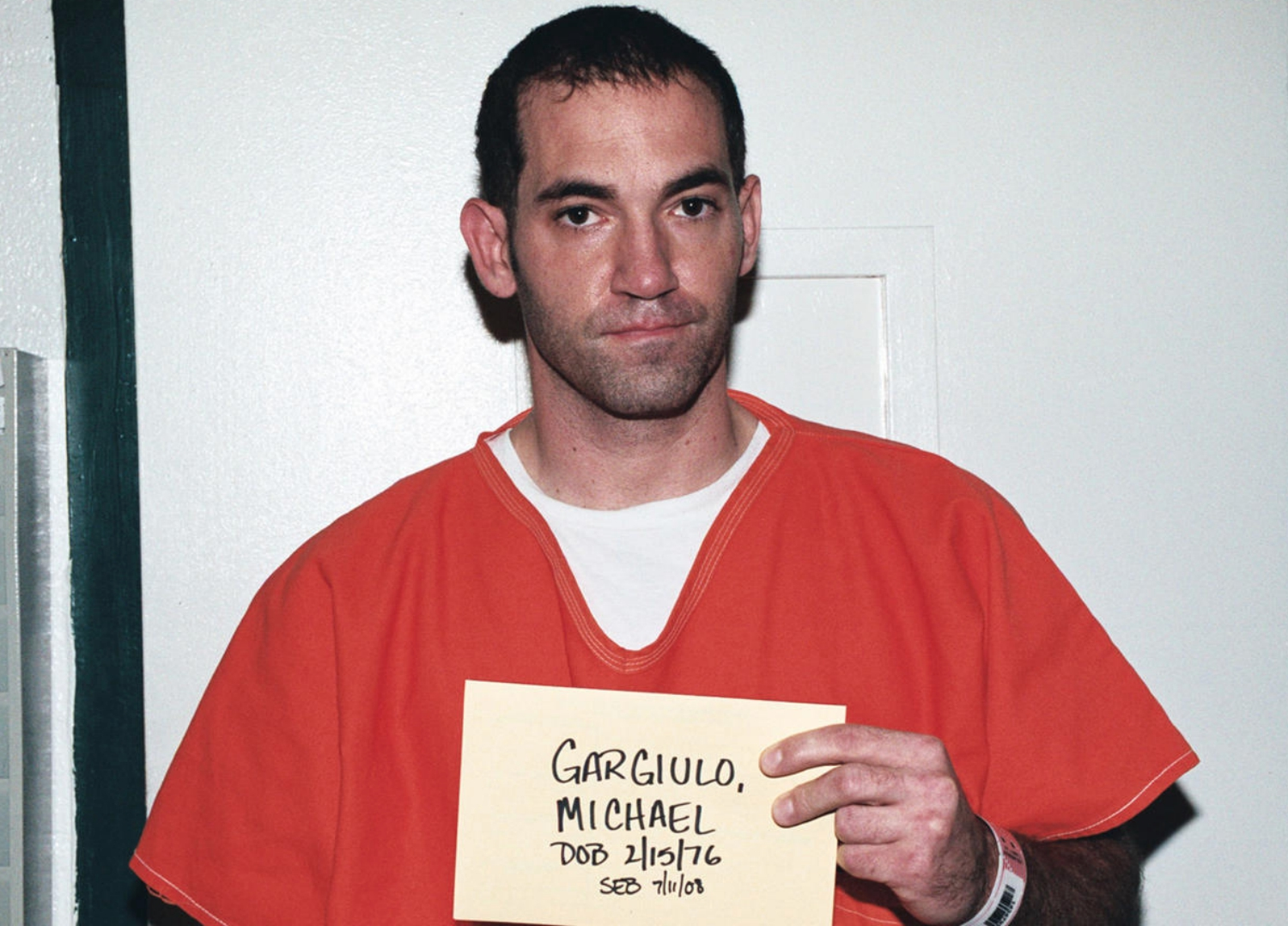
- Mugshot (July 2008)
- Born: Michael Thomas Gargiulo; February 15, 1976 (age 50); Glenview, Illinois, U.S.
- Other names: Hollywood Ripper; Chiller Killer; The Boy Next Door Killer
- Convictions: First degree murder with special circumstances (2 counts); Attempted murder
- Criminal charges: Felony murder
- Penalty: Death

Details
- Victims: 3; 1 survived
- Span of crimes: 1993–2008
- Country: United States
- States: Illinois; California
- Date apprehended: June 6, 2008

Michael Thomas Gargiulo (born February 15, 1976) is a convicted American serial killer. He moved to Southern California in the 1990s and gained the nickname The Hollywood Ripper. He was convicted of two counts of first-degree murder and sentenced to death on July 16, 2021. As of April 2023, he was incarcerated in the California Health Care Facility; in September 2024, he was extradited to Cook County, Illinois, to face trial for the 1993 murder of Tricia Pacaccio.

== Crimes ==
Gargiulo is a native of the Chicago suburb of Glenview, Illinois. He is believed to have committed his first murder at the age of 17 on August 13, 1993, when he stabbed his neighbor, 18-year-old Tricia Pacaccio, who was the sister of his friend, to death on her back doorstep. Her father Rick found her body the following morning on the back porch. Gargiulo moved to Los Angeles in 1998, allegedly to escape the scrutiny of the police in Illinois, and committed two murders and an attempted murder in Southern California between 2001 and 2008.

On February 21, 2001, he murdered 22-year-old fashion student Ashley Ellerin, stabbing her 47 times in her home in Hollywood. Ellerin's injuries included a neck wound that nearly severed her head and deep punctures to the chest, stomach, and back. Some of her wounds were up to six inches deep. According to detective Tom Small, one stab wound "actually penetrated the skull and took out a chunk of skull like a puzzle piece." On the night she was murdered, Ellerin had planned a date including dinner and drinks with actor Ashton Kutcher, whom she had met at a New Year's Eve party, right after her affair with landlord Mark Durbin who was the last person to see Ellerin alive. When she did not answer the door, Kutcher, who had arrived late after watching the 2001 Grammy Awards at a friend's house, looked through the window, saw what he thought was spilled wine on the floor, and returned home, feeling dejected.

On December 1, 2005, Gargiulo stabbed his neighbor, 32-year-old Maria Bruno, to death at her apartment complex in El Monte, California. She was stabbed 17 times and her breasts were mutilated.

Gargiulo attempted to murder another neighbor, 26-year-old Michelle Murphy, in her apartment in Santa Monica on April 28, 2008. She fought off the attack which in turn caused Gargiulo to cut himself in the wrist. Blood matching Gargiulo's DNA was found at the scene.

== Arrest and prosecution ==
Gargiulo was arrested by the Santa Monica Police Department on June 6, 2008. On July 7, 2011, the Cook County State's Attorney charged Gargiulo with the first-degree murder of Tricia Pacaccio. Although Gargiulo was charged in the two California murders as well as the Pacaccio murder in Illinois, police did not link him to any other murders. Gargiulo allegedly told authorities in the Los Angeles County Jail that just because ten women were killed—and his DNA was present—does not mean he murdered anyone, leading investigators to believe that there are more victims.

Media in Los Angeles dubbed Gargiulo the "Hollywood Ripper" and the "Chiller Killer." Gargiulo was held at Los Angeles County Jail while awaiting a capital murder trial. A pre-trial hearing was held on June 9, 2017, in Los Angeles Superior Court, with his trial scheduled to begin in October 2017. After delays, his trial began on May 2, 2019. In May 2019, actor Ashton Kutcher testified about the crimes.

On August 15, 2019, Gargiulo was convicted on all counts. The penalty phase of his California trial started on October 7, 2019. He faced either a death sentence or life in prison without the possibility of parole. On October 18, 2019, a jury rendered a verdict of death for Michael Gargiulo after several hours of deliberation, but sentencing for Gargiulo in California continued to be delayed by defense motions. On July 16, 2021, Gargiulo was sentenced to death.

Gargiulo was extradited to Illinois on September 6, 2024, to face trial for the 1993 killing of Tricia Pacaccio. If convicted he faces a sentence of life without parole.

== See also ==
- Capital punishment in California
- List of death row inmates in the United States
- List of serial killers in the United States
