= Death of Marvin Scott =

2021 death of a man in Texas police custody

- Date: March 14, 2021
- Location: McKinney, Texas
- Type: homicide
- Cause: Law enforcement detainment
- Motive: Undisclosed
- Outcome: death

Marvin David Scott III (1994/1995 – March 14, 2021) was an African American man who died on March 14, 2021, in police custody at a correctional facility in McKinney, Texas, United States. The Texas Ranger Division is conducting an independent criminal investigation of the incident. Seven law enforcement officers were placed on administrative leave.

On April 29, 2021, the Collin County Medical Examiner ruled that the manner of death in Scott's case was homicide. According to the examiner, the cause of death was "fatal acute stress response in an individual with previously diagnosed schizophrenia during restraint struggle with law enforcement."
