= Priming (immunology) =

First contact antigen-specific T helper cell precursors have with an antigen

Priming is the first contact that antigen-specific T helper cell precursors have with an antigen. It is essential to the T helper cells' subsequent interaction with B cells to produce antibodies. Priming of antigen-specific naive lymphocytes occurs when antigen is presented to them in immunogenic form (capable of inducing an immune response). Subsequently, the primed cells will differentiate either into effector cells or into memory cells that can mount stronger and faster response to second and upcoming immune challenges. T and B cell priming occurs in the secondary lymphoid organs (lymph nodes and spleen).

Priming of naïve T cells requires dendritic cell antigen presentation. Priming of naive CD8 T cells generates cytotoxic T cells capable of directly killing pathogen-infected cells. CD4 cells develop into a diverse array of effector cell types depending on the nature of the signals they receive during priming. CD4 effector activity can include cytotoxicity, but more frequently it involves the secretion of a set of cytokines that directs the target cell to make a particular response. This activation of naive T cell is controlled by a variety of signals: recognition of antigen in the form of a peptide: MHC complex on the surface of a specialized antigen-presenting cell delivers signal 1; interaction of co-stimulatory molecules on antigen-presenting cells with receptors on T cells delivers signal 2 (one notable example includes a B7 ligand complex on antigen-presenting cells binding to the CD28 receptor on T cells); and cytokines that control differentiation into different types of effector cells deliver signal 3.

== Cross-priming ==
Cross-priming refers to the stimulation of antigen-specific CD8+ cytotoxic T lymphocytes (CTLs) by dendritic cell presenting an antigen acquired from the outside of the cell. Cross-priming is also called immunogenic cross-presentation. This mechanism is vital for priming of CTLs against viruses and tumours.

== Immune priming (invertebrate immunity) ==
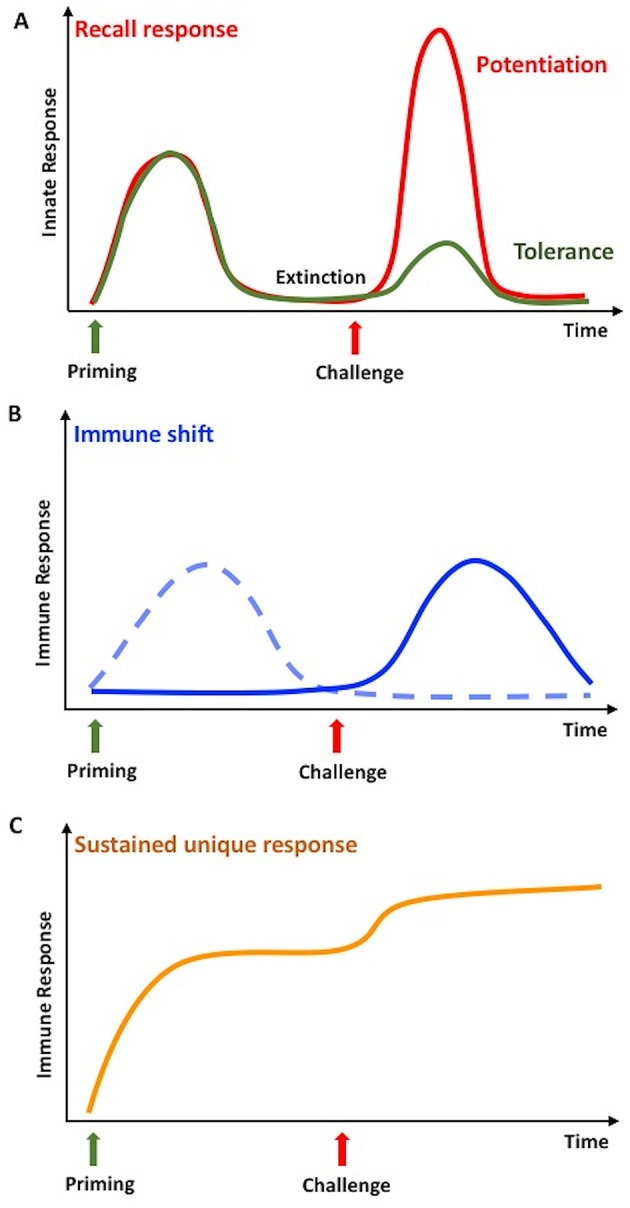
Innate memory in invertebrates and vertebrates. For more information click on the picture.

Immune priming is a memory-like phenomenon described in invertebrate taxa of animals, first described by Hans G. Boman and colleagues using Drosophila fruit flies. In vertebrates, immune memory is based on adaptive immune cells called B and T lymphocytes, which provide an enhanced and faster immune response when challenged with the same pathogen for a second time. It is evolutionarily advantageous for an organism to produce a rapid immune response to common pathogens it is likely to be exposed to again. In the 1940s-1960s, the budding field of immunology assumed that invertebrates did not have memory-like immune functions as they do not produce antibodies needed for adaptive immunity. In 1972, Boman and colleagues' experiments overturned this assumption, showing that fruit flies could be "vaccinated" against a repeat infection by the same bacteria if they were first exposed to a freeze-thawed pathogen. Flies previously exposed to freeze-thawed bacteria cleared subsequent infection better than naive flies. Since then, evidence supporting innate memory-like functions have been found across model invertebrates, including insects and crustaceans.

=== Mechanism of immune priming ===
Results of immune priming research commonly find that mechanism conferring defense against a given pathogen is dependent on the kind of insect species and microbe used for given experiment. That could be due to host-pathogen coevolution. For every species is convenient to develop a specialised defense against a pathogen (e.g. bacterial strain) that it encounters the most. In arthropod model, the red flour beetle Tribolium castaneum, it has been shown that the route of infection (cuticular, septic or oral) is important for the defence mechanism generation. Innate immunity in insects is based on non-cellular mechanisms, including production of antimicrobial peptides (AMPs), reactive oxygen species (ROS) or activation of the prophenol oxidase cascade. Cellular parts of insect innate immunity are hemocytes, which can eliminate pathogens by nodulation, encapsulation or phagocytosis. The innate response during immune priming differs based on the experimental setup, but generally it involves enhancement of humoral innate immune mechanisms and increased levels of hemocytes. There are two hypothetical scenarios of immune induction, on which immune priming mechanism could be based. The first mechanism is induction of long-lasting defences, such as circulating immune molecules, by the priming antigens in the host body, which remain until the secondary encounter. The second mechanism describes a drop after the initial priming response, but a stronger defence upon a secondary challenge. The most probable scenario is the combination of these two mechanisms.

=== Trans-generational immune priming ===
Trans-generational immune priming (TGIP) describes the transfer of parental immunological experience to its progeny, which may help the survival of the offspring when challenged with the same pathogen. Similar mechanism of offspring protection against pathogens has been studied for a very long time in vertebrates, where the transfer of maternal antibodies helps the newborns immune system fight an infection before its immune system can function properly on its own. In the last two decades TGIP in invertebrates was heavily studied. Evidence supporting TGIP were found in all colleopteran, crustacean, hymenopteran, orthopteran and mollusk species, but in some other species the results still remain contradictory. The experimental outcome could be influenced by the procedure used for particular investigation. Some of these parameters include the infection procedure, the sex of the offspring and the parent and the developmental stage.
