= Patient Specific Talus Spacer =

3D-printed bone implant

In February 2021, the U.S. Food and Drug Administration (FDA) approved the Patient Specific Talus Spacer 3D-printed talus implant for humanitarian use. The Patient Specific Talus Spacer is the first in the world and first of its kind implant to replace the talus; the bone in the ankle joint that connects the leg and the foot. The implant is used for the treatment of avascular necrosis (AVN) of the ankle joint, a serious and progressive condition that causes the death of bone tissue stemming from a lack of blood supply to the area. The implant provides a joint sparing alternative to other surgical interventions commonly used in late stage AVN that may disable motion of the ankle joint.

== Medical uses ==
The Patient Specific Talus Spacer is a 3D printed implant that can be used in talus replacement surgery. The talus spacer is made for each recipient individually modeled from computed tomography (CT) imaging and is fitted to a recipient's specific anatomy. During the replacement surgery, the recipient's talus bone is removed and replaced with the implant, which is made from cobalt chromium alloy. This procedure’s intention is to improve motion and reduce pain for AVN patients who would otherwise require ankle arthrodesis or amputation procedures.

== History ==
The FDA reviewed data for the Patient Specific Talus Spacer through the humanitarian device exemption (HDE) process. A Humanitarian Use Device (HUD) is a device that is intended to benefit people by treating or diagnosing a disease or condition that affects not more than 8,000 individuals in the U.S. per year.

Data supporting the safety and probable benefit of the Patient Specific Talus Spacer include results from 31 patients and 32 talus replacement surgeries (one patient had operations on both ankles) with the implant. At three years post-operation, the average reported pain decreased from "moderate to severe" prior to surgery to "mild" post-surgery, and average range of motion in the ankle joint also improved. These measures were assessed using standard subjective scoring systems for pain and functionality.

By the three-year mark, out of 32 cases, there were three reported additional surgeries. The most common reported adverse events were pain and scar tissue at the surgery site.

The FDA granted the HDE approval of the Patient Specific Talus Spacer to Additive Orthopaedics, LLC.
