= COVID-19 pandemic in Vermont =

- Disease: COVID-19
- Pathogen: SARS-CoV-2
- Location: Vermont, U.S.
- Index case: Bennington
- Arrival date: March 7, 2020 (6 years, 5 months, 1 week and 2 days)
- Confirmed cases: 149,298
- Hospitalized cases: 25 (current)
- Recovered: 106,430
- Deaths: 881

Government website
- www.healthvermont.gov/covid

The COVID-19 pandemic in the U.S. state of Vermont is part of an ongoing worldwide viral pandemic of coronavirus disease 2019 (COVID-19), a novel infectious disease that is caused by severe acute respiratory syndrome coronavirus 2 (SARS-CoV-2).

As of February 24, 2022, Vermont has administered 1,300,000 COVID-19 vaccine doses. 517,100 people have received at least one dose, and 480,500 people have received a second dose.

== Timeline ==
COVID-19 pandemic medical cases in Vermont by county
County (Note: County where individuals with a positive case reside. Location of diagnosis and treatment may vary.)	Cases (Note: Reported confirmed and probable cases. Actual case numbers are probably higher.) (Note: Includes 1,573 cases from unknown counties.)	Deaths (Note: Includes 2 deaths from unknown counties.)	Population (Note: 2018 population estimate from "HS-STAT-2019-Population-Estimates-Bulletin.pdf" (PDF). Vermont Department of Health.)	Cases / 100k
14 / 14	129,854	654	626,299	20,733.5
Addison	6,000	18	36,973	16,228.1
Bennington	10,280	71	35,631	28,851.3
Caledonia	5,888	26	30,302	19,431.1
Chittenden	34,978	177	164,572	21,253.9
Essex	1,307	3	6,250	20,912.0
Franklin	10,385	68	49,421	21,013.3
Grand Isle	1,142	5	7,090	16,107.2
Lamoille	3,974	17	25,300	15,707.5
Orange	4,449	14	28,999	15,341.9
Orleans	6,667	38	26,907	24,777.9
Rutland	13,821	74	58,672	23,556.4
Washington	12,563	51	58,140	21,608.2
Windham	7,087	37	42,756	16,575.5
Windsor	9,740	53	55,286	17,617.5
Final update May 18, 2022, with data through the previous day Data is publicly reported by Vermont Department of Health

The Vermont Department of Health announced the state's first case of COVID-19 on March 7, 2020, in a patient who had arrived at a hospital emergency department in Bennington, Vermont two days prior.

On March 19, the first two deaths from COVID-19 were announced, one a male in White River Junction and the other a female in Burlington. Both were over 80 years old.

On April 7, the Vermont Department of Health released a new COVID-19 data dashboard with more detailed statistics about the spread of COVID-19 in Vermont.

On July 16, 2020, Vermont became the first state nationwide to not report any COVID-19 deaths in the span of a 30-day period.

On November 11, 2020, Vermont reported its highest number of cases, 72, since the pandemic began.

== Economic and social effects ==
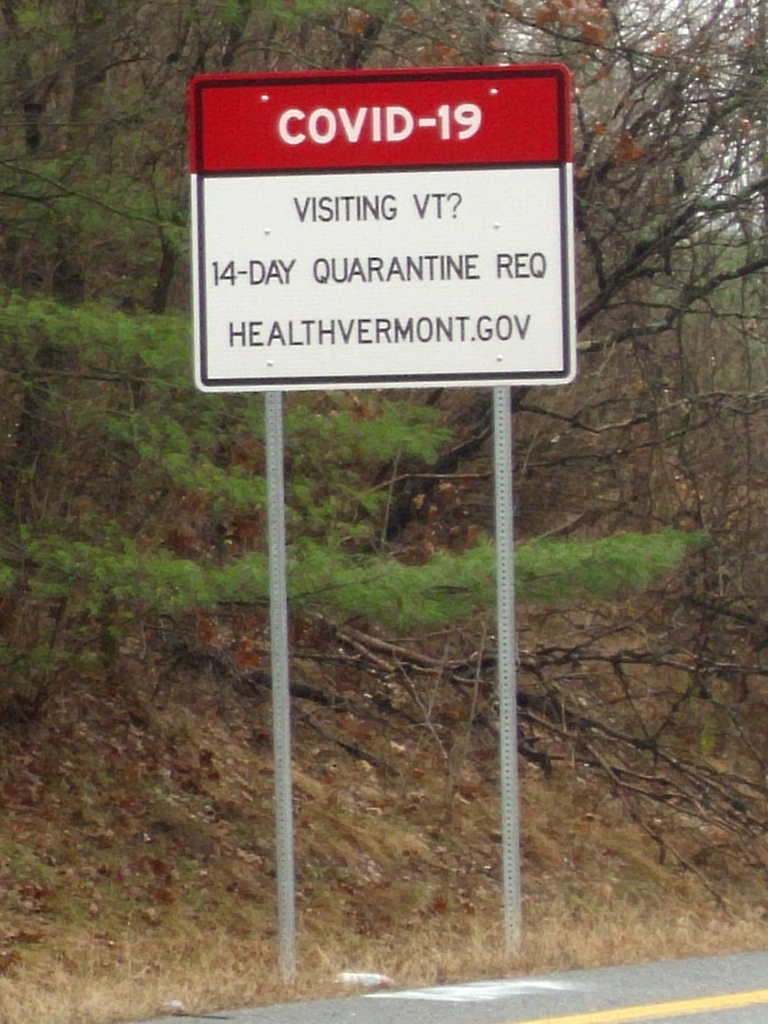
A road sign at an exit on Interstate 91, photographed in November 2020.

Many businesses were ordered to close in mid-March 2020. Starting on Monday, April 20, certain businesses were allowed to reopen.

On May 11, Governor Scott announced that Vermont retail stores can begin reopening on Monday, May 18. Businesses were required to limit customers to 25 percent of the legal capacity. Employees were required to wear masks and maintain appropriate distance from co-workers and customers.

=== Schools closed ===
All schools were ordered to be closed for in-person classes as of Wednesday, March 18, until at least April 6, 2020. On March 26, this closure was extended through the rest of the academic year.

On March 23, the University of Vermont declared that all students must leave the UVM campus by March 30, except for those approved for emergency housing. Courses will be taught online for the remainder of the semester. UVM officials also indicated they will make a decision about canceling UVM's commencement ceremony by the end of March 2020.

=== Closure of restaurants and bars ===
Bars and restaurants were ordered to close by 2:00pm on Tuesday, March 17, and to remain closed until April 6. Restaurants were allowed to continue providing takeout and delivery service. All gyms, spas, hair salons, and tattoo parlors were ordered closed as of 8:00pm on March 23, 2020.

=== Impact on media ===
On March 17, 2020, the publisher of three newspapers in southern Vermont, Brattleboro Reformer, Bennington Banner and Manchester Journal indicated that all full-time staff members would be furloughed for one of the next five weeks.

On March 20, 2020, the Barre Montpelier Times Argus and Rutland Herald newspapers announced that due to the financial impact of the pandemic they would be reducing their print publishing to three days a week and temporarily laying off 20 staffers.

On March 23, 2020, Seven Days indicated they would lay off seven employees.

On March 26, 2020, the Waterbury Record published its final issue after 13 years of publishing in Waterbury, VT. The weekly community newspaper had never been profitable but was trying to survive. Publisher Greg Popa indicated that the coronavirus crisis made this no longer possible.

The Burlington Free Press announced on April 3, 2020, that all Free Press journalists will have a temporary reduction of 25% in time and hours for the next three months.

== Government response ==
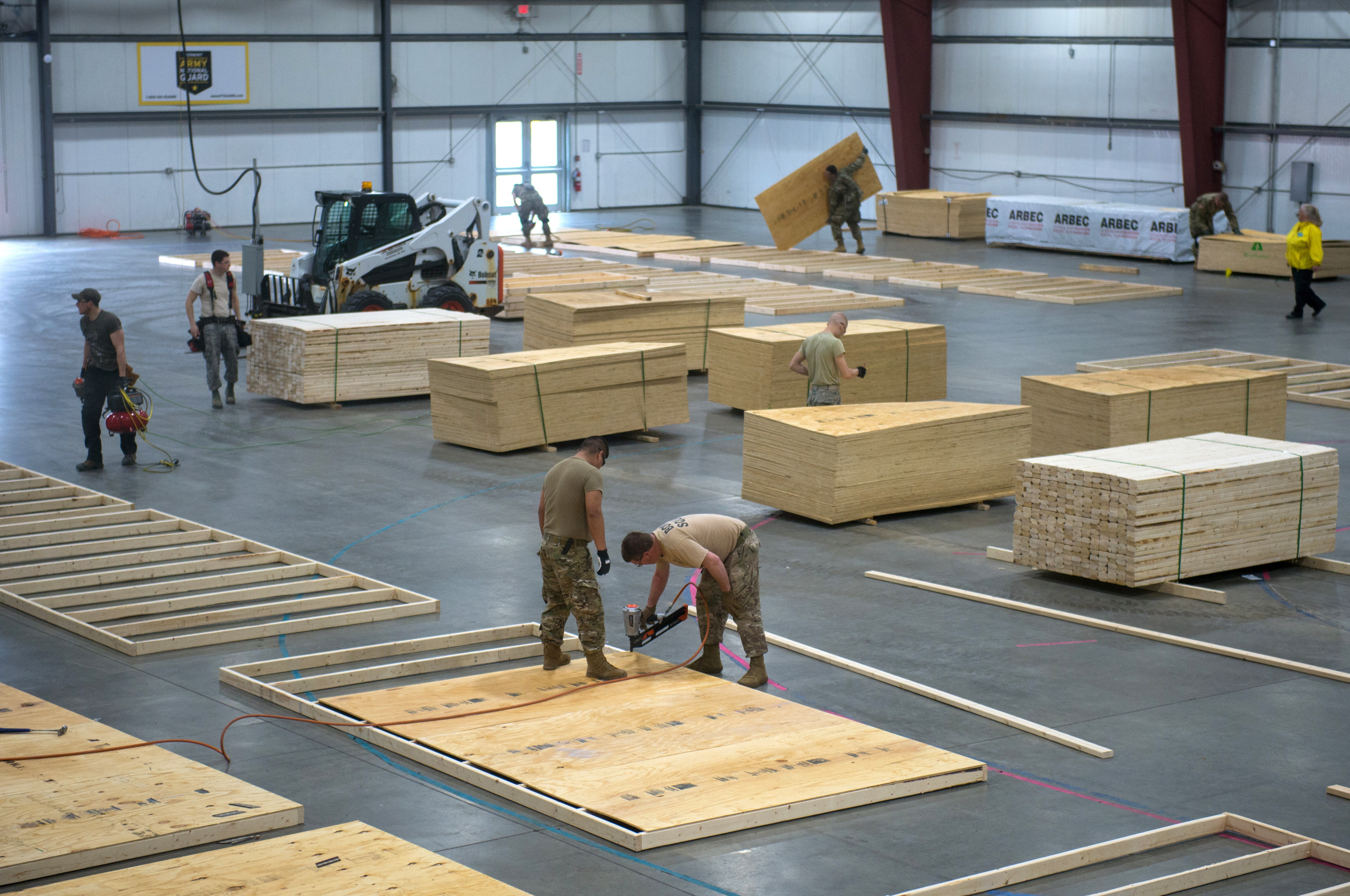
Vermont National Guardsmen build a 400-bed medical surge facility at the Champlain Valley Expo in Essex Junction, April 4, 2020

On March 10, the Vermont State Emergency Operations Center was activated. On March 13, a COVID-19 task force was set up and Governor Phil Scott issued Executive Order 01-20 which declared a State of Emergency until April 15. The Executive Order limited visitors to nursing homes, assisted living residences, residential care homes, and specific care facilities. It also suspended traveling by state employees for non-essential government business and prohibited most mass gatherings, excluding transit, most offices, and grocery and commercial stores. The National Guard was also activated. Additionally, the Vermont General Assembly voted to adjourn until March 24 to prepare for the virus.

On March 15, Scott ordered all schools in Vermont to be closed and all school activities to be cancelled no later than Wednesday, March 18, and lasting through at least April 6. On March 16, Scott announced his emergency declaration would be amended to limit public gatherings to either 50 people or 50% occupancy. Also on March 16, Burlington Mayor Miro Weinberger declared a state of emergency for Burlington and ordered all bars and restaurants to close on the 17th, and part of the 18th. All nonessential city services were also suspended from March 18 through at least April 6.

On March 17, Scott ordered the closure of all Vermont child care programs, except for those that serve people "essential" to responding to the pandemic, through April 6. Essential persons included healthcare providers, criminal justice personnel; public health employees; firefighters; Vermont National Guard personnel; other first responders and state employees; and staff and providers of necessary childcare services.

On March 20, Scott announced that he would be working with the state legislature to develop a loan program through the Vermont Economic Development Authority (VEDA) for businesses impacted economically by the pandemic. He also announced that Vermont businesses could apply for economic injury disaster loans through the Small Business Administration (SBA). The Vermont Department of Public Service released a "Public Wi-Fi Hot Spot Map" to enable people in Vermont to find places to access the Internet for free. Vermont state officials also stated that the number of available beds statewide had increased to 500 and the number of available ventilators had increased to 240.

On March 21, Scott ordered the closure of gyms and similar exercise facilities, hair salons, spas and tattoo parlors by 8 pm on March 23. He also extended his earlier executive order to restrict gatherings to no more than 10 people. On March 23, Scott ordered the Vermont National Guard and the Vermont Emergency Operations Center to set up a medical "surge site" to respond to COVID-19 cases.

On March 24, Scott issued a "Stay Home, Stay Safe" order directing all residents of Vermont to stay home "leaving only for essential reasons, critical to health and safety." The order directed that all businesses and not-for-profit entities suspend all in-person business operations, except for specific exemptions. The order would remain in effect until April 15, 2020, unless extended or shortened. On March 26, Governor Scott ordered all schools in Vermont to remain closed for in-person classes for the rest of the academic year.

On March 30, Scott imposed quarantine restrictions on travelers arriving in Vermont. On March 31, the Vermont Agency of Commerce and Community Development ordered large retailers "to cease in-person sales of non-essential items in order to reduce the number of people coming into the stores." The agency also ordered stores to close showrooms and garden sections of home improvement centers. Scott also announced the launch of a website where Vermonters could volunteer to help in the state's response to COVID-19.

On April 2, Scott announced that the state, in anticipation of a surge in COVID-19 cases, was preparing two additional medical surge locations in partnership with the Vermont National Guard: a 400-bed location at the Champlain Valley Exposition in Essex Junction, and a 150-bed location in Rutland County. Additional rapid reaction medical surge trailers, each containing materials for 50 additional beds, had been prepositioned throughout the state to facilitate rapid deployment. Additional assets, including two state portable hospitals, were also being prepared to prevent hospitals from exceeding their capacities in the event of a surge.

On April 3, the Vermont Department of Health recommended that all Vermonters should wear face masks when in public. Health officials in Vermont had previously advised against the general public wearing masks if they were not showing any symptoms, but the new recommendation cited a 48-hour, pre-symptomatic infectious phase in individuals with COVID-19 where face masks would be beneficial. Scott stated in a media briefing that he was planning to extend the state's stay-at-home order beyond its original ending date in mid-April, warning Vermonters that they should expect to remain at home for several more weeks.

An April 3 directive from Vermont Attorney General T.J. Donovan provided police with guidelines on how to enforce the state's stay-at-home order. Law enforcement officers were directed to provide education and request voluntary compliance when encountering businesses and individuals in violation of the order, while civil and criminal penalties were outlined for instances of continued non-compliance. Miro Weinberger additionally announced that the Burlington Police Department would begin issuing tickets to people who violated the stay-at-home order, with fines ranging from $100–$500.

On April 4, the Vermont National Guard started building a 400-bed overflow hospital inside the Champlain Valley Exposition center.

Vermont's Agency of Transportation stationed staff at 28 "high-priority border crossings" with neighboring states and Canada where they monitored traffic to determine how many people were entering Vermont.

On April 10, Scott extended the state of emergency until May 15.

On April 14, the Vermont Economic Mitigation and Recovery Task Force was established by Scott under the Agency of Commerce and Community Development. This task force was charged with helping the economy of Vermont recover from the COVID-19 pandemic.

On April 16, Scott and the Vermont Department of Public Service announced a partnership with Microsoft, RTO Wireless, and Up And Running I.T to deploy public WiFi access points in communities around Vermont that lacked Internet access.

On April 17, Scott announced that starting on Monday, April 20, 2020, certain businesses would be allowed to re-open, including outdoor businesses and "low-contact" services. Farmers markets were also allowed to open starting on May 1.

On April 20, the Vermont Department of Health announced a partnership with The King Repairs to deploy public hotlines for support dealing with the pandemic, and future support outreach.

On April 21, Scott and Vermont Department of Financial Regulation Commissioner Michael Pieciak announced a new program to provide financial assistance to Vermonters with privately held student loans. On the same day, the Vermont National Guard announced they would be distributing Meals, Ready-to-Eat (MREs) to Vermonters from five airports around the state between April 22 and April 29.

On April 24, Scott issued guidance about the continued re-opening of businesses in Vermont. The order required any businesses opening to implement specific measures including requiring employees to wear coverings over their mouth and nose. Outdoor businesses including construction could resume with a maximum of five total workers per location.

On April 29, Scott announced that the state would be expanding the COVID-19 testing program to scale up to performing 7,500 tests per week (from the current 2,000 / week). The state would also expand its contact tracing program to help identify who else may be in contact with a person who tested positive.

On May 6, Scott announced that some forms of outdoor recreation could resume, as well as gatherings between households, as long as the gatherings consisted of 10 people or fewer, and appropriate protections were put in place. The order also allowed businesses, government entities, and non-profit organizations to resume outdoor recreation or fitness activities that involve low or no direct physical contact.

On August 14, Scott extended the state of emergency through September 15. His order also allowed cities and towns to enact stricter local limits if necessary.

=== Transition to endemic stage ===
On June 14, 2022, Vermont's Health Commissioner Mark Levine described COVID-19 as endemic and stated that "COVID-19 is still with us and will continue to evolve, but so has our knowledge of the virus and how to respond," and went on to encourage the use of at-home tests. Acknowledging declining positivity rates, Scott stressed the importance of socialization and strengthening communities.

== See also ==
- Timeline of the COVID-19 pandemic in the United States
- COVID-19 pandemic in the United States – for impact on the country
- COVID-19 pandemic – for impact on other countries
