= David Crabtree =

American journalist

- Born: Nashville, Tennessee, U.S.
- Education: Middle Tennessee State University; Duke Divinity School
- Occupations: Journalist; News Anchor; Television Executive; Former Clergyman
- Years active: 1982-present
- Children: 2
- Awards: 16 Emmy Awards; Gabriel Award; DuPont Award; Four-time North Carolina Journalist of the Year; North Carolina Anchor of the Year
- Honours: NC Media Journalism Hall of Fame; Order of the Long Leaf Pine

David Crabtree is an American journalist, former television news anchor, and television executive. He served as the lead anchor of WRAL-TV in Raleigh, North Carolina, for much of his 28 years at the network through 2022. Following a forty-year career in television reporting, he was named the chief executive officer (CEO) of PBS North Carolina. Crabtree has won 16 Emmy awards, is a recipient of the North Carolina Order of the Long Leaf Pine, and is a member of the NC Media & Journalism Hall of Fame.

== Career ==
Crabtree was raised in Nashville, Tennessee, and graduated from Middle Tennessee State University. Crabtree started out his career as a musician, playing drums professionally with bands in Nashville and doing session work for radio jingles, which led to a job as a radio disc jockey. He left radio to work as press secretary for the Tennessee House of Representatives.

=== Television career ===
Crabtree started his television career as a reporter on Nashville’s WKRN-TV. He later worked at KCNC-TV and KMGH-TV in Denver, Colorado and WITN-TV in Washington, North Carolina. In 1994 he became a news anchor at WRAL-TV in Raleigh, North Carolina. Crabtree announced his retirement from WRAL in 2018 and was set to retire at the end of that year, but announced in November 2018 that he would postpone his retirement and continue working at WRAL. Crabtree hosted his final broadcast on May 25, 2022. In April 2022, Crabtree was named as interim Chief Executive Officer of PBS North Carolina. In September 2022, Crabtree was appointed permanently as the CEO of PBS North Carolina by the University of North Carolina Board of Governors.

==== Awards ====
Crabtree has won 16 Emmy Awards and was named North Carolina Journalist of the Year four consecutive years by the Radio-Television News Directors Association of the Carolinas. He was named the 2014 North Carolina Association of Broadcasters Anchor of the Year. He has also received the Gabriel Award and Alfred I. duPont-Columbia University Award in 2007 for his documentary on living conditions for migrant workers in North Carolina. He notably won a Midsouth Emmy award for coverage of the 2010 Haiti earthquake, and was additionally nominated in 2011 for a Midsouth Emmy for coverage of the funeral for Elizabeth Edwards.

Crabtree was also inducted into the Order of the Long Leaf Pine by governor Roy Cooper on May 25, 2022, the same day of his retirement from WRAL. The day was declared “David Crabtree Day” by the mayor of Raleigh.

He was inducted into the NC Media Journalism Hall of Fame in April, 2023.

=== Ministerial Work ===
Crabtree was ordained a deacon in the Episcopal Church in 2004. He served as an assisting minister at St. Michael's Episcopal Church in Raleigh from 2004 until 2018. Crabtree was permanently suspended from ministry by the Episcopal Diocese of North Carolina after allegations of improper conduct were made against him in October 2018. Crabtree made a personal statement explaining his removal from ministry, stating that he had engaged in a consensual relationship with a woman that violated church protocol.

== Personal life ==
Crabtree is from Nashville, Tennessee. He graduated with a bachelors of science from Middle Tennessee State University. He later studied divinity at Vanderbilt University and obtained a masters in theology from the Graduate Theological Foundation before enrolling as a masters student at Duke University's Divinity School. Crabtree is divorced and has two daughters.
