= Jordan Harbinger =

American podcaster and radio personality

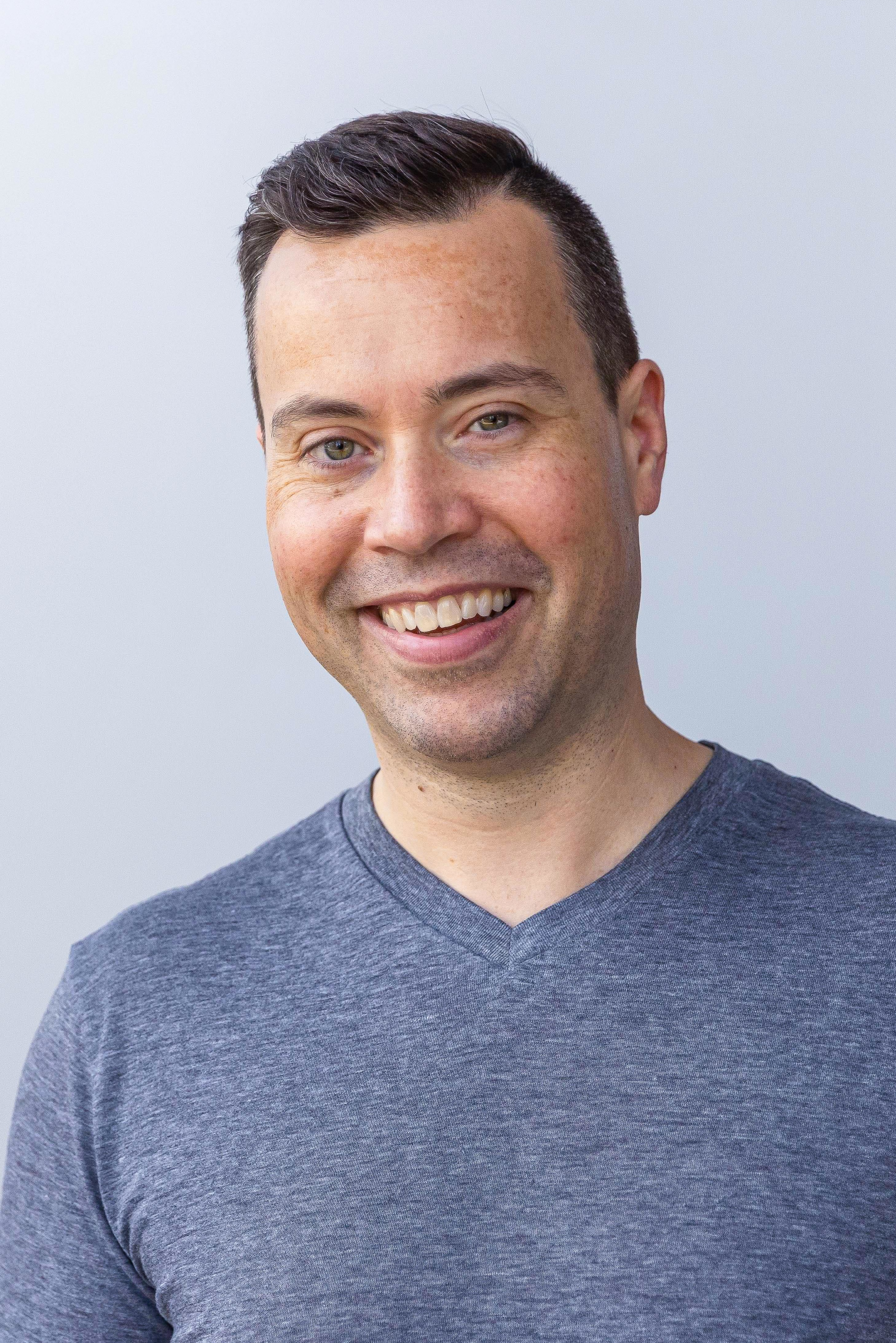
- Harbinger in 2020
- Born: Royal Oak, Michigan, United States
- Citizenship: United States
- Education: University of Michigan (B.A.), 2004; University of Michigan Law School (J.D.), 2006
- Years active: 2006–present
- Known for: The Jordan Harbinger Show; The Art of Charm
- Awards: Apple's Best of 2018 (2018)

Signature
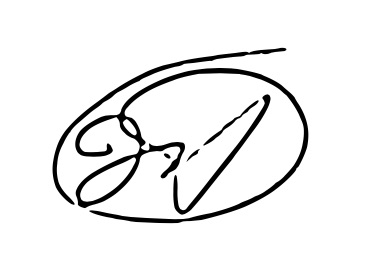

Jordan Harbinger is an American independent podcaster, radio personality and former pickup artist. His media career began with The Art of Charm podcast before he launched The Jordan Harbinger Show.

== Education and early career ==
Harbinger studied law at the University of Michigan and subsequently moved to Manhattan and practiced as a lawyer. In 2007, he was employed by a Wall Street firm to work on mortgage-backed securities and was later made redundant during the 2008 financial crisis.

Harbinger later promoted himself as an "adventure traveller" who travelled to unsafe locations and was subsequently kidnapped on two separate occasions, once in Mexico and again in Serbia. He was hired as a tour guide for "Rebel Tours" (circa 2013–2016) facilitating travel for Westerners into North Korea via China.

== Media career ==
=== Early podcasting ===
Harbinger began broadcasting in 2006 while in law school. His first podcast focused on date coaching and was called The PickUp Podcast.

In 2010 he launched an app, and in 2011 he co-hosted a radio talk show with Joshua Pellicer called Game On on both Sirius and XM Satellite. The show concluded its run in 2011.

=== Art of Charm ===
Harbinger co-founded The Art of Charm podcast to help people build better social skills. He hosted the podcast for 11 years.

Starting in 2015, Harbinger initiated a rebranding effort, shifting from his original "pickup artist" persona to a more generalized self-help image. As part of this transformation, he began to present himself as a host who profiles, invites, and engages in conversations with public figures.

=== The Jordan Harbinger Show ===
In early 2018, Harbinger split from his former partners, left The Art of Charm podcast, and started a new interview-based business podcast called The Jordan Harbinger Show to teach networking and communication. It debuted with approximately five million downloads and one-thousand reviews on iTunes, making it one of Apple's "Best of 2018" and one of the most downloaded shows of the year.

In 2021, Harbinger signed a renewal deal on the PodcastOne network. In 2023, according to Entrepreneur, the show averaged five to ten million downloads a month. A few years later, in March 2026, the show ranked as one of the Top 15 Performing Independent Podcasts according to the Oxford Road Benchmark Intelligence Tool (ORBIT).

== Other appearances ==
In 2013 Harbinger demonstrated at DEF CON how easily a person can be manipulated into divulging information to someone who may not be what they claim to be, based on the Robin Sage experiment of 2010.

In 2020 Harbinger interviewed Billy McFarland while McFarland was in federal prison. During the interview, McFarland admitted guilt publicly for the first time. The interview was filmed by ABC News and featured in season 1, episode 4 of The Con.
