= Presutti =

Presutti is an Italian surname. Notable people with the surname include:

- Carolyn Presutti, American television correspondent
- Giuliano Presutti (active, 1490–1557), Italian painter of the Renaissance period
- Raffaele Filippo Presutti (1845–1914), Italian bishop and missionary
