= Ali Dehghantanha =

Iranian - Canadian cyber security expert

- Born: 1982 (age 43–44); Mashhad, Iran
- Occupation: Academic entrepreneur
- Known for: Research in the field of cybersecurity and threat intelligence
- Awards: Outstanding Leadership Award, IEEE; Marie-Curie International Incoming Fellowship; Research Excellence Award, University of Guelph College of Engineering and Physical Sciences

Academic background
- Education: Ph.D. Security in Computing – University Putra Malaysia

Ali Dehghantanha is an academic-entrepreneur in cybersecurity and cyber threat intelligence. He is a Professor of Cybersecurity and a Canada Research Chair in Cybersecurity and Threat Intelligence.

Dehghantanha is a pioneer in applying machine learning techniques toward cyber threat hunting, cyber threat intelligence, and enterprise risk management. His research is highly cited in both academic and industrial settings. He is the Founder and Director of Cyber Science Lab.

== Education ==
After completing his Diploma in Mathematics at National Organization for Development of Exceptional Talents (NODET), Dehghantanha attended Islamic Azad University, Mashhad Branch, from which he graduated with a bachelor's degree in Software Engineering in 2005. He earned his Master's and Doctoral degrees in Security in Computing from University Putra Malaysia in 2008 and 2011, respectively.

== Career ==
Dehghantanha started his academic career as Sr. Lecturer of Computer Science and Information Technology at the University Putra Malaysia in 2011, and later on joined the University of Salford as Marie Curie International Incoming Post-Doctoral Research Fellow in 2015. From 2017 to 2018, he held appointment as Sr. Lecturer (Associate Professor) in the Department of Computer Science at the University of Sheffield. Following this appointment, he joined the University of Guelph, Ontario, Canada, as an Associate Professor and Director of Master of Cybersecurity and Threat Intelligence program. He became a Tier 2 NSERC Canada Research Chair in Cybersecurity and Threat Intelligence at the University of Guelph in 2020. He also holds a concurrent appointment as Adjunct Associate Professor in Schulich School of Engineering's Department of Electrical & Software Engineering at the University of Calgary since 2020. He has developed two Master's programs in cybersecurity, one in the University of Guelph – Canada, and another in the University of Salford.

== Research ==
Dehghantanha is among highly cited researchers in cybersecurity. He is well-recognized for his research in cyber threat intelligence, and in several fields of cyber security including malware analysis, Internet of Things (IoT) security, and digital forensics.

=== Application of AI in Cyber Threat Hunting and Attribution ===
Dehghantanha was among the first to introduce some major security and forensics challenges within the Internet of Things (IoT) domain. He also reviewed previous studies published in this special issue targeting identified challenges. In 2016, he proposed a two-layer dimension reduction and two-tier classification model for anomaly-based intrusion detection in IoT backbone networks. He has influenced the IoT/ICS network defense field by creating an Intrusion Detection System (IDS) for IoT networks, a secret sharing method of encryption key exchange in vehicular IoT networks, and a method for secret key sharing and distribution between IoT devices. He conducted experiments using NSL-KDD dataset, and proved that his proposed model outperforms previous models designed to detect U2R and R2L attacks. His most notable contributions were made to building AI-based methods for cyber-attack identification and analysis in IoT. Moreover, he developed a Deep Recurrent Neural Network structure for in-depth analysis of IoT malware.

Dehghantanha introduced ensemble-based multi-filter feature selection method for DDoS detection in cloud computing, and also discussed its applications in terms of detection rate and classification accuracy when compared to other classification techniques. While presenting a systematic literature review of blockchain cyber security, he conducted a systematic analysis of the most frequently adopted blockchain security applications. The systematic review also highlights the future directions of research, education and practices in the blockchain and cyber security space, such as security of blockchain in IoT, security of blockchain for AI data, and sidechain security. Furthermore, he focused his study on machine learning aided Android malware classification, and also presented two machine learning aided approaches for static analysis of Android malware.

=== Frameworks for Cybersecurity Technology Adoption and Organizational Risk Assessment ===
In 2019, Dehghantanha built a framework that models the impacts of adopting Privacy Enhancing Technologies (PETs) on the performance of SMEs in Canada. He has also created several frameworks for security analysis of cloud platforms, including CloudMe, OneDrive, Box, GoogleDrive, DropBox, MEGA, and SugarSync. He also works to create frameworks for breach coaching and exposure management. In 2016, he published a book entitled Contemporary Digital Forensic Investigations of Cloud and Mobile Applications, and explored the implications of cloud (storage) services and mobile applications on digital forensic investigations.

== Awards and honors ==
- 2016 - Senior Member, Institute of Electrical and Electronics Engineers (IEEE)
- 2016 - Fellowship, U.K. Higher Education Academy
- 2018 - Marie-Curie International Incoming Fellowship
- 2020 - Research Excellence Award, University of Guelph College of Engineering and Physical Sciences
- 2020 - Tier II Canada Research Chair in Cybersecurity and Threat Intelligence
- 2021 - Outstanding Leadership Award, IEEE

== Bibliography ==
=== Books ===
- Contemporary Digital Forensic Investigations of Cloud and Mobile Applications 1st Ed. (2016) ISBN 9780128053034
- Cyber Threat Intelligence (2018) ISBN 9783319739502
- Handbook of Big Data and IoT Security (2019) ISBN 9783030105433
- Blockchain Cybersecurity, Trust and Privacy (2020) ISBN 9783030381813
- Handbook of Big Data Privacy (2020) ISBN 9783030385576
- Handbook of Big Data Analytics and Forensics (2021) ISBN 9783030747527

=== Selected articles ===
- Pajouh, H. H., Javidan, R., Khayami, R., Dehghantanha, A., & Choo, K. K. R. (2016). A two-layer dimension reduction and two-tier classification model for anomaly-based intrusion detection in IoT backbone networks. IEEE Transactions on Emerging Topics in Computing, 7(2), 314–323.
- Osanaiye, O., Cai, H., Choo, K. K. R., Dehghantanha, A., Xu, Z., & Dlodlo, M. (2016). Ensemble-based multi-filter feature selection method for DDoS detection in cloud computing. EURASIP Journal on Wireless Communications and Networking, 2016(1), 1–10.
- Milosevic, N., Dehghantanha, A., & Choo, K. K. R. (2017). Machine learning aided Android malware classification. Computers & Electrical Engineering, 61, 266–274.
- Conti, M., Dehghantanha, A., Franke, K., & Watson, S. (2018). Internet of Things security and forensics: Challenges and opportunities. Future Generation Computer Systems, 78, 544–546.
- Taylor, P. J., Dargahi, T., Dehghantanha, A., Parizi, R. M., & Choo, K. K. R. (2020). A systematic literature review of blockchain cyber security. Digital Communications and Networks, 6(2), 147–156.
