= West German University Press =

West German University Press (also "The University Press Bochum") is a spin-off of the Ruhr University Bochum in Germany.

== Founding ==
In 1999 the university press was founded as a spin-off of Ruhr University Bochum with funds from the Northrine-Westfalian Ministry of Innovation, Science and Research, under the so-called Program for financially safeguarding the founding of enterprises from within universities. As a preparation, in 1998 the model of Harvard University Press was studied in Cambridge MA, some elements were taken over for the founding process in Germany.

== Memberships ==
Immediately with its founding, the university press became a member of the Association of German Book Trade. Since 2003, the press is member of the European University Press, a network of European University Presses, and since 2014 in the international Association of University Presses.

== Program ==
Currently more than 400 books and journals are available, about half of it dissertations, the other half conference proceedings, festschrifts, research reports, second books and scripts. The press has 44 book series, a part of it edited by chairs, institutes or colleges of Ruhr University Bochum. The journals are peer reviewed and listed in different impact lists, e.g. the "Floristic Letters" in the Masterlist of Journals by Thomson Reuters.

== Mission ==
The West German University Press distributes the research results of Ruhr University Bochum or research results written or edited by authors of Ruhr University Bochum. The press has the duty to distribute the scientific output of the university worldwide in libraries. The university press annually attends the Frankfurt Book Fair. New publications are produced as hybrid publication, as book (often hardcover) and electronically, partially open access.

== Printing subsidies ==
The University Press has own funds to support excellent works and it helps the authors to apply for printing subsidies as well as national awards. Since its founding in 1999 the press has acquired printing subsidies of more than 100,000 Euros. The University Press receives a large part of its budget from public sources and is supported by the non-profit organization "Friends and Sponsors of the University Press Bochum". The University Press does not need financial support by Ruhr University Bochum.

== Cooperation with its university ==
The University Press cooperates with its university and its academic community on several levels within the framework of about 20 cooperation contracts. Chairs and institutes edit book series in the press. The bodies of the University Press are the Board of Trustees, the Faculty Board, the management as well as quality assurance councils. All bodies are made up of authors of Ruhr University Bochum.
