= DREAD (risk assessment model) =

Computer security threat assessment model

DREAD (Damage, Reproducibility, Exploitability, Affected users, Discoverability) is a risk assessment and threat modeling system for computer security threats. When a given threat is assessed using DREAD, each category is given a rating from 1 to 10, and the sum of all ratings is taken to assess the overall risk.

== See also ==
- Cyber security and countermeasure
- STRIDE
