= Cyber Threat Intelligence League =

Global Volunteer Cybersecurity Organization

- Trade name: CTI League
- Industry: Computer; Cyber Security; Network Security
- Founded: March 14, 2020
- Founders: Ohad Zaidenberg; Marc Rogers; Nate Warfield
- Website: cti-league.com

The Cyber Threat Intelligence (CTI) League is a cybersecurity group formed in 2020 which focuses on healthcare organizations.

Analysis of content on cybercrime forums related to targeting of healthcare organizations during the COVID-19 pandemic, showed that healthcare organizations were targeted in "every populated continent", with nearly two-thirds of being within North America and Europe. The CTI League website lists the goals of the group to reduce or neutralize threats to medical organizations and support law enforcement agencies in combating public safety threats.

In 2020, Wired magazine recognized the CTI League in its "WIRED25: People Who Are Making Things Better" list. The magazine highlighted the league's formation of a 1,500-member volunteer team to defend healthcare sectors against cyber threats during the COVID-19 pandemic. The CTI League was chosen as one of the 2020 Difference Maker Award Winners by the SANS Institute. The award recognized the league's rapid growth and significant contribution in neutralizing cyber threats during the COVID-19 pandemic.

== Membership ==
Members of the group are volunteer Cyber threat intelligence experts, law-enforcement and government personnel. The CTI-League was founded by:

- Ohad Zaidenberg
- Nate Warfield
- Marc Rogers

In 2020, membership in the group included over 1400 volunteers from 76 countries.

== Censorship accusations ==
In 2023, it was claimed that the CTIL had been working on behalf of government agencies, including the United States Department of Homeland Security, to influence public opinion and censor information online.
