= Carolyn Presutti =

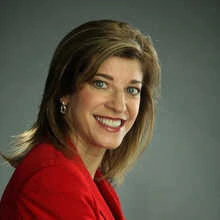
- Born: Bellaire, Ohio, U.S.
- Occupations: Journalist, television correspondent
- Employer: Voice of America

Carolyn Presutti is a Voice of America (VOA) senior television correspondent based in Washington, DC.

== Education and career ==
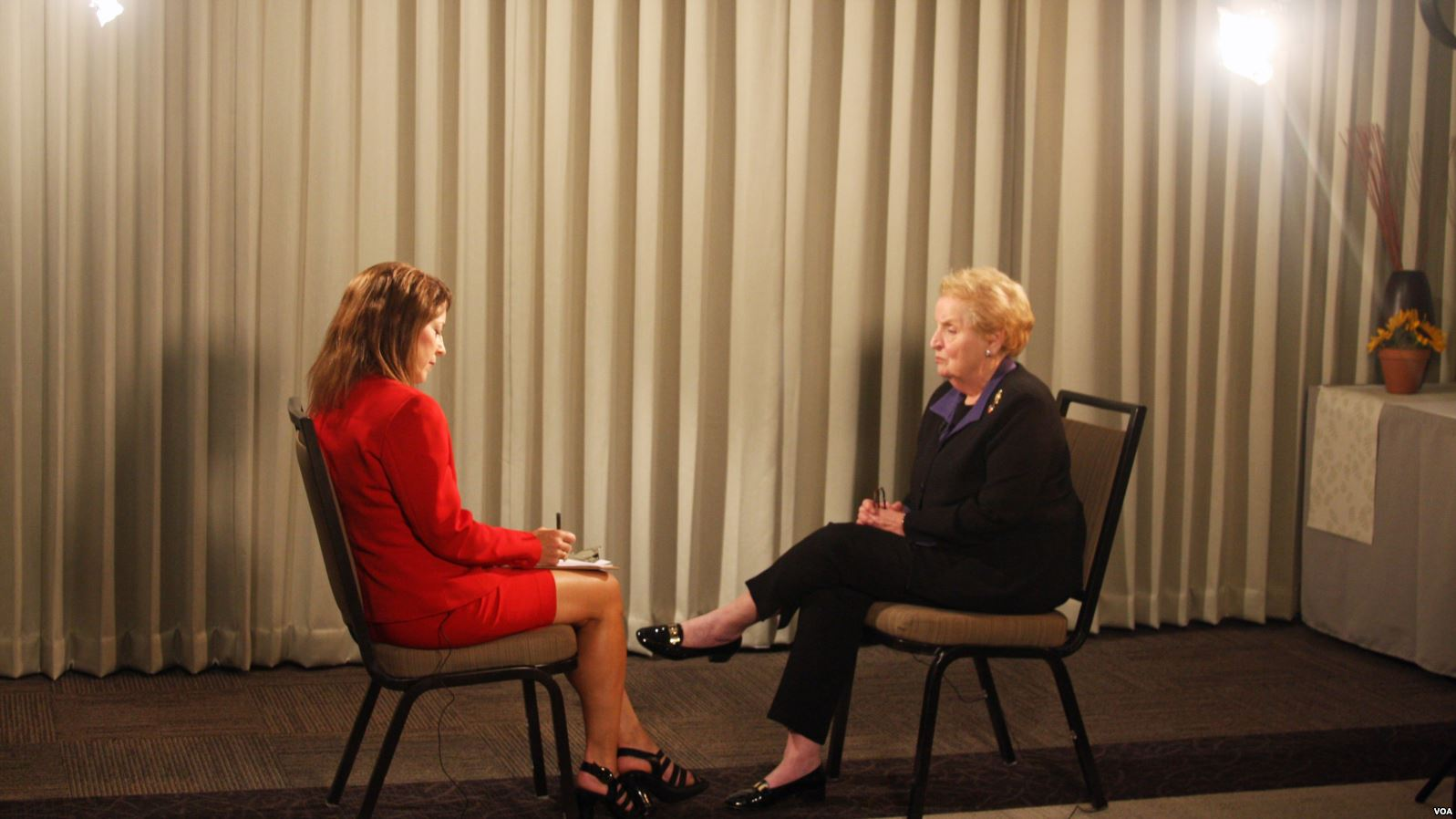
Carolyn Presutti interviewing former Secretary of State Madeleine Albright in 2012.

Carolyn Presutti reporting on US-Syrian intervention in 2017.

Presutti was raised by Clara and Dominic Presutti in Bellaire, Ohio. Her ancestry is Italian. Dominic enlisted in the United States Navy during World War II and witnessed the iconic flag- raising during the Battle of Iwo Jima. Later, he co-owned and managed Ohio Fireworks Mfg. & Display Co.

Carolyn Presutti graduated from the University of Akron.

She began her journalism career at WHBC Radio in Canton, Ohio, and WKBN Radio in Youngstown, Ohio.

She moved into television at WFMJ-TV in Youngstown, Ohio, as chief weathercaster and nightside reporter. Then, she was a state capital reporter and weekend anchor at WTVR-TV in Richmond, Virginia. She worked for Baltimore, Maryland's WMAR-TV until 1994. Presutti was subsequently a morning anchor at WUSA-TV in Washington, DC, making public appearances and serving as emcee at the 1996 Sons of Italy Banquet, which was attended by Senator Bob Dole, Alfred Checchi and Joe Paterno. In 1996, she joined A.H. Belo broadcasting group, where she co-hosted the weekly political talk show “Capital Conversation,” with Dallas Morning News bureau chief Carl Luebsdorf. Presutti joined VOA in 2007.

In 2011, VOA sent Presutti to Haiti for the anniversary of the 2010 earthquake. There, she conducted exclusive interviews with the President of Haiti, Michel Martelly, and was invited to join the presidential motorcade. She also conducted the first interview with Sophia Martelly after she became Haiti's first lady. Presutti's feature story on an amputee Haitian soccer team won an Associated Press award.

Presutti provided initial coverage following the 2013 Boston Marathon bombing, returning to report on the event's first anniversary. In 2014, she partnered with a cappella group, Pentatonix, to cover the first use of Google Glass at a professional concert. Presutti covered Hillary Clinton's headquarters and concession speech after the candidate's 2016 presidential election loss. In 2019, she led the US coverage of the agency-wide project, The Worth of a Girl, which won numerous national and international awards. Presutti covered the 2020 election and Joe Biden's acceptance speech in Wilmington, Delaware.

=== Film and video ===
In addition to journalism, Presutti has appeared as a television news anchor in the Netflix series House of Cards, headlined by Kevin Spacey and Robin Wright, and as a U.S. senator's wife in the HBO series Veep alongside Julia Louis-Dreyfus. After appearing as an extra in the 2010 romantic comedy How Do You Know, starring Reese Witherspoon and Owen Wilson, she published an article about her experience in Washingtonian Magazine.

== Awards ==
Year	Award	Organization	Work	Result
2010	53rd Emmy Awards	National Academy of Television Arts and Sciences	The Flying Circus	Won
2011	38th Annual Daytime Entertainment Emmy Awards	National Academy of Television Arts and Sciences	AARP program, My Generation	Nominated
2012	Clarion Award	Association for Women in Communications	Television Feature Story: The Falling Man	Won
2013	Best Sports Feature	Chesapeake Associated Press Broadcasters Association	Coverage of the 2010 Haiti earthquake	Won
2014	Silver Medal	New York Festivals	Coverage of Syrian-American doctors, virtual surgeries	Won
2017	Best in Show, Outstanding Digital Feature Project	Chesapeake Associated Press Broadcasters Association	American Muslim Portraits	Won
2020	Edward R. Murrow Award	Radio Television Digital News Association	The Worth of a Girl	Won
2020	Clarion Award for Online Journalism	Association for Women in Communications	The Worth of a Girl	Won
2020	Silver Medal	New York Festivals	The Worth of a Girl	Won
