= Himax =

Taiwanese fabless semiconductor manufacturer

- Type: Public
- Traded as: Nasdaq: HIMX
- Industry: Semiconductor industry
- Founded: 12 June 2001
- Headquarters: Tainan City, Taiwan
- Key people: Biing-Seng Wu, Jordan Wu (CEO), C.C. Tsai, Baker Bai
- Products: Integrated circuits
- Number of employees: 2163
- Website: www.himax.com.tw

Himax Technologies, Inc. (Nasdaq: HIMX) is a fabless semiconductor manufacturer headquartered in Tainan City, Taiwan founded on 12 June 2001. The company is publicly traded and listed on the Nasdaq Stock Market under the symbol HIMX. Himax Technologies Limited functions as a holding under the Cayman Islands Companies Law.

== Business overview ==
Himax is a fabless semiconductor solution provider dedicated to display imaging processing technologies. It is a worldwide market leader in display driver ICs and timing controllers used e.g. in TVs, laptops, monitors, mobile phones, tablets, digital cameras, car navigation, virtual reality (VR) devices and other consumer electronics devices. Additionally, it designs and provides controllers for touch sensor displays, in-cell Touch and Display Driver Integration (TDDI) single-chip solutions, LED driver ICs, power management ICs, scaler products for monitors and projectors, tailor-made video processing IC solutions, silicon IPs and LCOS micro-displays for augmented reality (AR) devices and head-up displays (HUD) for automotive. Additional offers include digital camera solutions, including CMOS image sensors and wafer level optics for AR devices, 3D sensing and machine vision, which are used in a wide variety of applications such as mobile phone, tablet, laptop, TV, PC camera, automobile, security, medical devices, home appliance and Internet of Things. For display drivers and display-related products, customers include panel manufacturers, agents or distributors, module manufacturers and assembly houses. Himax Technologies also works with camera module manufacturers, optical engine manufacturers, and television system manufacturers for various non-driver products.

== Additional information ==
Semiconductor intellectual property core designed by Himax Technologies is for example used in the OLPC XO-1 subnotebook laptop computer.

On July 22, 2013, it was announced that Google will take a 6.3% stake in Himax Display, a subsidiary of the company which focuses on liquid crystal on silicon chips being used in Google Glass.
