= Marc Rogers (security researcher) =

British cyber security researcher

Marc Rogers is a British information security expert and ethical hacker. He received media attention for uncovering vulnerabilities in modern technologies such as Google Glass and Tesla's Model S. He was also involved in the protection of medical facilities against hackers seeking to exploit health organizations during the COVID-19 pandemic.

Rogers is one of the organizers and the director of security at DEF CON, the world’s largest hacker conference.

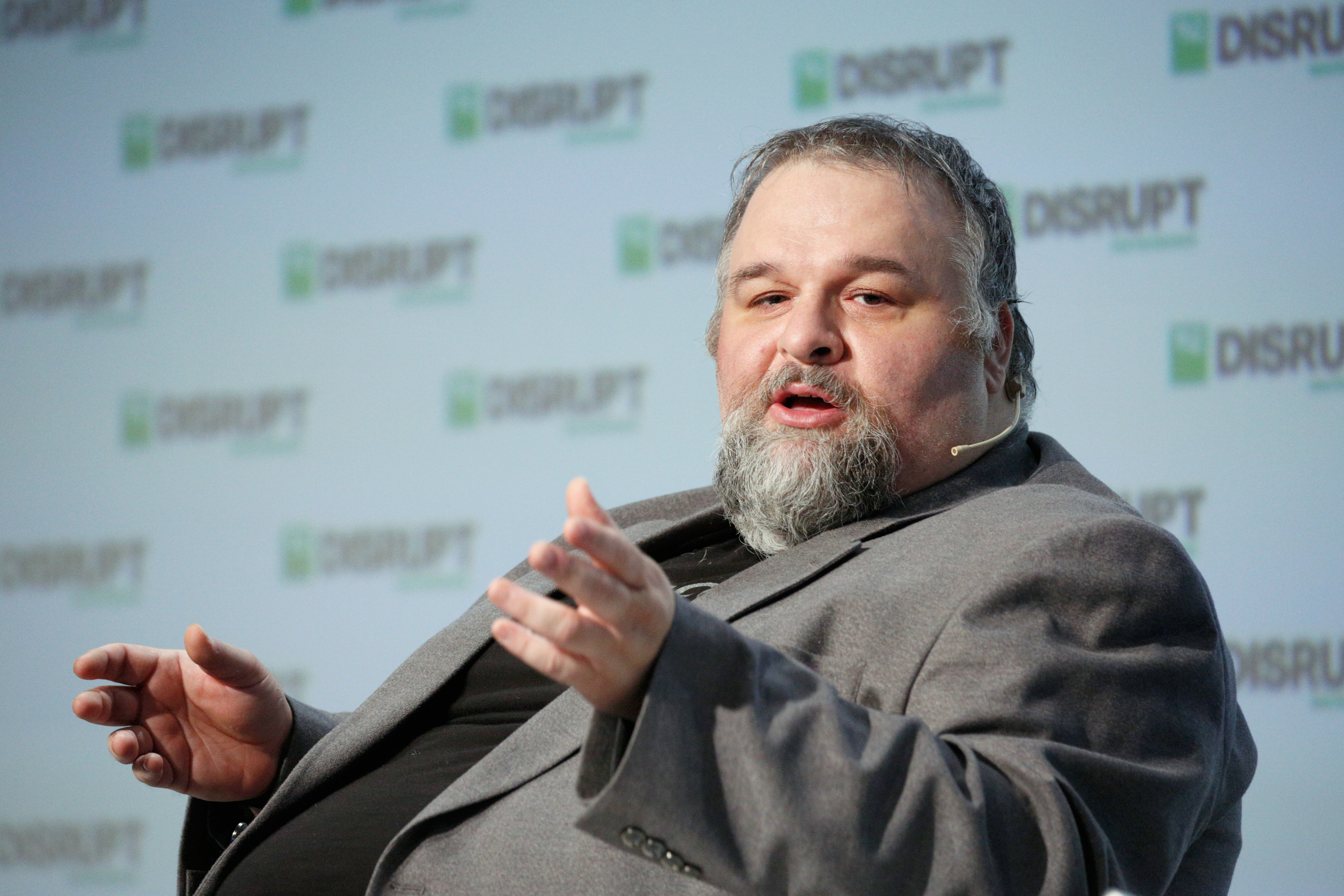
Marc Rogers at TechCrunch Disrupt in 2018

== Biography ==
Rogers started as a lone hacker during the 1980s and was known by his trade name “Cjunky”. Years later, he transitioned to ethical hacking and initially worked for a series of European companies. In 2003, he started working for Vodafone and rose to its head of security until he left the company after six years. By 2013, he was employed as the Principal Security Researcher for Lookout. Rogers then transferred to Cloudflare eventually becoming the Head of Information Security, a post he held until 2018. Rogers became the vice president of Cybersecurity Strategy for Okta, Inc. from 2018 until 2022. In the same year, he became a senior technical advisor for the Institute for Security and Technology (IST).

Rogers is a member of the U.S. Ransomware Task Force. He was a recipient of the President’s Volunteer Services Award in 2023 for his work with the U.S. government against cyber criminals and cyber security threats. He is now based in San Francisco.

=== Noted initiatives ===
As the principal security researcher of Lookout, Rogers identified a flaw in Google Glass that gave the hacker complete control of the device. Another noted hack was his exploit of Apple’s TouchID technology, which gave him control of the iPhone 5’s fingerprint sensor, a feat that he also executed on the iPhone 6. Together with Kevin Mahaffey, Rogers also breached the technology-heavy Model S car in 2015 during his employment as principal security researcher at CloudFlare. Using a laptop, they were able to remotely control various Tesla functions. They hacked the company’s network and accessed data that allowed them to get administrative access to the Model S.

In 2020, Rogers co-founded the COVID-19 Cyber Threat Intelligence (CTI) League, a group formed to combat hacks against medical facilities and frontline respondents during the COVID-19 pandemic. The group is composed of nearly 400 cybersecurity expert volunteers and Rogers was one of its four initial managers. He is also among the organizers of DEF CON security conference, the largest gathering of hackers in the world.

Rogers also does consultation work for television shows that deal with cyber security such as Mr. Robot and The Real Hustle. He is currently the co-founder and chief technology officer of the startup nbhd.ai.

In 1999, Rogers wrote an article A New Hacker Taxonomy suggesting the classification of computer criminals based on factors that provide opportunities to commit cybercrime such as affordability, acceptable risk, attractiveness, availability, and anonymity.
