= Q-Warrior =

Q-Warrior is a wearable computer with a helmet-mounted display technology similar to, 3D HUD, that gives a soldier a picture of the entire battlefield. The prototype was modelled on the Google Glass and built by BAE Systems in 2014.
