= STRIDE model =

Model for identifying computer security threats

STRIDE is a model used for developing threat models. The name is an abbreviation of spoofing, tampering, repudiation, information disclosure, denial of service and elevation of privilege.

Developed by Praerit Garg and Loren Kohnfelder at Microsoft, it provides a mnemonic for security threats in six categories. Each STRIDE category corresponds to a core principle of information security: Authenticity, Integrity, Non-repudiability, Confidentiality, Availability and Authorization.

== See also ==
- Attack tree – another approach to security threat modeling, stemming from dependency analysis
- DREAD – a classification system for security threats
- OWASP – an organization devoted to improving web application security through education
- CIA triad – another mnemonic for a security model to build security in IT systems
