= Honey trapping =

Investigative practice using romantic or sexual relationships

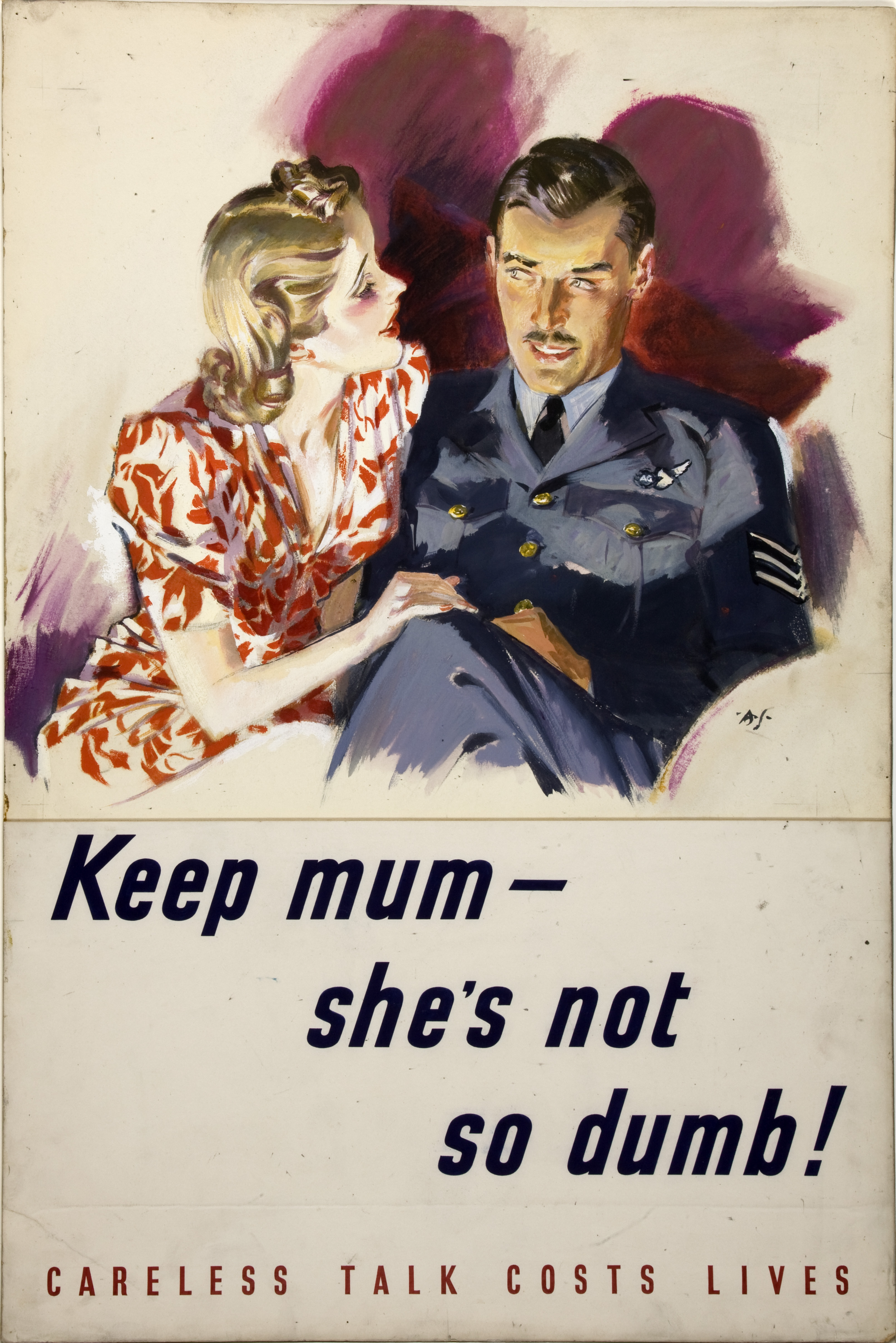
Careless Talk Costs Lives poster from World War II, depicting an attractive woman speaking to a Royal Air Force sergeant; the woman may be a spy.

Honey trapping is a practice involving the use of romantic or sexual relationships for interpersonal, political (including state espionage), or monetary purpose. The honey pot or trap involves making contact with an individual who has information or resources required by a group or individual; the trapper will then seek to entice the target into a false relationship (which may or may not include actual physical involvement) in which they can glean information or influence over the target. Alternatively, an existing partner of the target may be recruited.

The term "honey trap" is also used when dating sites are used to gain access to a victim.

Private investigators are often employed to create a honey pot by wives, husbands, and other partners usually when an illicit romantic affair is suspected of the "target", or subject of the investigation. Occasionally, the term may be used for the practice of creating an affair for the purpose of taking incriminating photos for use in blackmail. A honey trap is used primarily to collect evidence on the subject of the honey trap. Honey trapping is also used in getting a new user addicted to illegal drugs and also for drug smuggling.

== Espionage ==
Honey trapping has a long history of use in espionage. The term was coined by John Le Carré in his 1974 novel Tinker Tailor Soldier Spy, though the concept predates the book. The exact origin of honey trapping is unknown; former FBI agent Michael Feinberg speculated that the practice may date back to prehistoric times.

During the Cold War, agentesses called "Mozhno girls" (lit. 'Go-ahead girls'), or "Mozhnos" for short, were used by the KGB of the USSR to spy on foreign officials by seducing them. The name Mozhno comes from the Russian word можно (mozhno), meaning "it is permitted", as these agents were allowed to breach regulations that restricted Soviet contact with foreigners.

In 2009, the British MI5 distributed a 14-page document to hundreds of British banks, businesses, and financial institutions, titled "The Threat from Chinese Espionage." It described a wide-ranging Chinese effort to blackmail Western business people over sexual relationships. The document explicitly warns that Chinese intelligence services are trying to cultivate "long-term relationships" and have been known to "exploit vulnerabilities such as sexual relationships [...] to pressurise individuals to co-operate with them."

== Private investigators ==
Each assignment varies depending on what the agent and client decide on during their prior consultation. A common assignment consists of the agent initiating contact with the subject through face-to-face interaction. The agent will attempt to take the communication further into other outlets including: e-mail, text messaging, phone calls, etc. The step after this can be considered the most crucial moment of the assignment. The agent will propose a second meeting to the subject. Whether or not the subject agrees to further communication will determine whether the assignment will go deeper or come to an end. Hotels are often used as a meeting place to determine whether the subject intends for the relationship to escalate. Once the investigation comes to an end, the agent will turn over any record of communication they had with the subject. Other documents that are recorded include: photographs, videos, venue appointments, etc.

== See also ==
- Sexpionage
- Kompromat – The production of incriminating material (often of illicit sexual encounters) in order to blackmail, discredit or pressurize a political opponent.
- Extortion – Practice of obtaining money or goods through coercion.
- Femme fatale
- Honeypots in espionage fiction
- Operation Midnight Climax – A covert CIA program to investigate the use of LSD on San Francisco men in fake brothels; brothels were used because men would be less likely to report drugging in brothels to police.
- Salon Kitty – A Berlin brothel used by the SS for espionage during World War II.
- UK undercover policing scandal
- Love bombing
- Catfishing
- Robin Sage – A fictional cyberthreat analyst that demonstrated the effectiveness of honey trapping within the American intelligence community
- Badger game
