= Glass OS =

Operating system

Glass OS (Google XE)
- Developer: Google
- Written in: C (core), C++, Java
- OS family: Android
- Working state: discontinued
- Source model: Open source with closed source components
- Initial release: XE4 / April 11, 2013
- Final release: XE23 / June 20, 2017
- Marketing target: Augmented Reality
- Available in: Multi-lingual
- Update method: FoTA
- Supported platforms: 32-bit ARM
- Kernel type: Monolithic (modified Linux kernel)
- License: Developer Preview: proprietary Apache License 2.0; Linux kernel patches under GNU GPL v2
- Official website: www.google.com/glass

Glass OS (Google XE) was a version of Google's Android operating system designed for Google Glass. "glass-omap" Tag is used in referring to the modified Android code which can be found inside Kernel Repository. Glass OS was discontinued on June 20, 2017.

== Release history ==
The following list shows the main changes happened for each update release. For more detailed release notes visit the support website.

=== April 11, 2013: XE4.0 ===
Initial release.

=== May 7, 2013: XE5.0 ===
XE5 updates included:

- Change to sync policy: require power + WiFi for background uploads
- Crash reporting
- Incoming G+ notifications (direct shares, comments, +mentions), including ability to comment and +1
- Incoming Hangout notifications
- Transcription of queries & messages is now wicked-fast
- Long-press to search from anywhere in the UI (no longer just from off)
- International number dialing + SMS
- Hop animation on disallowed swipes in the UI
- New On-Head Detection calibration flow
- Show device Serial Number on Device Info card
- More reliable estimation of battery charge remaining
- New recipient-list mosaic

=== June 4, 2013: XE6.0 ===
XE6 updates include:

- Better photos through Glass
- Voice annotate your photos and videos when sharing
- Improvements to On-Head Detection. Please re-calibrate to enable the improvements.
- Improved cards in Google Now for Sports, and a new card for Birthdays
- Fixes for several issues

== Glass OS update ==
Glass updated itself automatically over the air. Glass checked Google servers periodically for updates. When an update was available, Glass downloaded it to the device and installed it. This required the device to be connected to a charger and a Wi-Fi network.
