= Structural vulnerability (computing) =

In computing, a structural vulnerability is an IT system weakness that consists of several so-called component vulnerabilities. This type of weakness generally emerges due to several system architecture flaws.

An example of a structural vulnerability is a person working in a critical part of the system with no security training, who doesn’t follow the software patch cycles and who is likely to disclose critical information in a phishing attack.
