= Loren Kohnfelder =

Computer scientist

Loren Kohnfelder is a computer scientist working in public key cryptography.

== Work ==
Kohnfelder invented what is today called public key infrastructure (PKI) in his May 1978 MIT S.B. (BSCSE) thesis, which described a practical means of using public key cryptography to secure network communications. The Kohnfelder thesis introduced the terms "certificate" and "certificate revocation list" as well as numerous other concepts now established as important parts of PKI. The X.509 certificate specification that provides the basis for SSL, S/MIME and most modern PKI implementations are based Kohnfelder's thesis.

He was also the co-creator, with Praerit Garg, of the STRIDE model of security threats, widely used in threat modeling.

In 2021 he published the book Designing Secure Software with No Starch Press.
