= European University Press =

European University Press was founded on 20 January 2003 in Dülmen in Germany. It has several outlets in Germany and tries to have a regional networking role for other European university presses. So far, the University Press has published books of members and institutions of more than 30 European universities.

== Aims ==
The European University Press wants to enhance the visibility of international and especially European research results especially in comparison to American research results which are seen as dominating. For this purpose, it fosters multilinguality when introducing new publications and supports English abstracts of German and French research results. It also supports an English paper as a condensation of a non-English monograph. It encourages European scholars to submit English papers, summarizing their research and making it accessible in English. Therefore, the European University Press is better known under its English name (despite its German origin).

== Instruments ==
The European University Press is operator of the platform sciencenet.eu for books published by university presses. The press fosters the establishment of instruments of quality assurance such as peer review, the 'European Impact Factor', 'European Citation Index' as well as open access by professional presses. University presses fulfilling the quality criteria of the European University Press, can become members of the network, they are entitled to use the logo of European University Press.

== Innovation ==
The European University Press published the first book to be read with Google Glass on 8 October 2014, as introduced at the Frankfurt Book Fair. The book can be read as a normal paper book or - enriched with multimedia elements - with Google Glass, Kindle, on Smartphone and Pads on the platforms iOS and Android.
