= Radio Television Digital News Association of the Carolinas =

American professional organization

The Radio Television Digital News Association of the Carolinas is a professional organization of radio and television stations, networks, cable, and news services in North and South Carolina. The association conducts professional development meetings and seminars, as well as an annual meeting where awards are presented.

The association maintains student chapters in Elon University, the University of North Carolina at Chapel Hill, the University of South Carolina, and Winthrop University.

== See also ==
- Radio Television Digital News Association
