= Kill chain =

Kill chain may refer to:

- Kill chain (military), a military concept which identifies the structure of an attack
- Cyber kill chain, a process by which perpetrators carry out cyberattacks
- Kill Chain (film), a 2019 film
- "Kill Chain", an episode of NCIS season 11
