= Attack path management =

Attack path management is a cybersecurity technique that involves the continuous discovery, mapping, and risk assessment of identity-based attack paths. Attack path management is distinct from other computer security mitigation strategies in that it does not rely on finding individual attack paths through vulnerabilities, exploits, or offensive testing. Rather, attack path management techniques analyze all attack paths present in an environment based on active identity management policies, authentication configurations, and active authenticated "sessions" between objects.

== Overview ==
Attack path management relies on concepts such as mapping and removing attack paths, identifying attack path choke points, and remediation of attack paths. Identity-based attacks are present in most publicly disclosed breaches, whether through social engineering to gain initial access to Active Directories or lateral movement for privilege escalation. Attackers require privileges to attack an environment’s most sensitive segments. Attack path management often involves removing out-of-date privileges and privilege assignments given to overly large groups.

In attack path management, attack graphs are used to represent how a network of machines’ security is vulnerable to attack. The nodes in an attack graph represent principals and other objects such as machines, accounts, and security groups.

The edges in an attack graph represent the links and relationships between nodes. Some nodes are easy to penetrate due to short paths from regular users to domain admins, resulting in focal points of concentrated network traffic, which are known as attack path choke points. Attack graphs are often analyzed using algorithms and visualization.

Attack path management also identifies tier 0 assets, which are considered the most vulnerable because they have direct or indirect control of an Active Directory or Microsoft Entra ID environment.
