= Mitsubishi Space Software =

Mitsubishi Space Software Co., Ltd. 三菱スペース・ソフトウエア株式会社

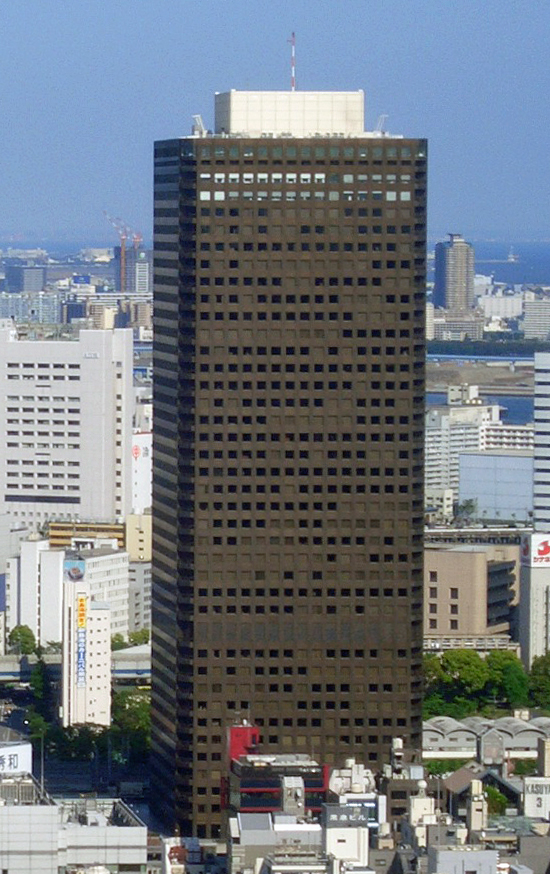
- World Trade Center Building in Tokyo, where the head office of Mitsubishi Space Software is located
- Native name: 三菱スペース・ソフトウエア株式会社
- Company type: Public (K.K)
- Traded as: Unlisted
- Industry: Information Communication
- Founded: March 20, 1962; 64 years ago
- Headquarters: World Trade Center BLD, 2-4-1, Hamamatsu, Minato, Tokyo, Japan.
- Key people: Yasunori Kamochi (President & CEO)
- Revenue: ¥21.3 billion (2017)
- Owner: Mitsubishi Electric Corporation (89%); Mitsubishi Heavy Industries, Ltd. (8%); MUFG Bank, Ltd.（3%）
- Number of employees: 976 (March 2018)
- Subsidiaries: Nippon Advanced Technology Co., Ltd.
- Website: Mitsubishi Space Software Co., Ltd.

Mitsubishi Space Software Co., Ltd. (三菱スペース・ソフトウエア株式会社, Mitsubishi Supēsu Sofutōea Kabushiki-gaisha), often abbreviated as MSS, is a corporation in the Mitsubishi Electric corporation series that develops special software, such as space systems. It belongs to the Mitsubishi Group and is one of the member companies of the Mitsubishi Public Affairs Committee.

== Overview ==
The company's ordering and production of defense-related products mainly takes the form of licensed production between companies connected to the US Department of Defense. Since the conclusion of the Japan–US Security Treaty, heavy emphasis was placed on interoperability among defense relations. In order to perform this software maintenance and inspection, Mitsubishi Electric Corporation and other major companies of the Mitsubishi Group established Mitsubishi Space Software through a joint investment with TRW.

As the company's main operations, it conducts and offers the research and development, design, manufacturing, selling, and other services related to various fields dealing with information sciences, including Space Systems, Aviation Systems, Defense Systems, Bioinformatics, Information Communication Systems, Disaster Prevention & Environmental Systems, System Integration, and ASP/products.

== History ==
The company's history started in 1962 as a joint venture between Mitsubishi Corporation of Japan and TRW of the United States. After ending the agreement with TRW and changing the company's name, it has proceeded to expand and advance into new fields.

- 1962, March: With Mitsubishi Electric at the center, the Mitsubishi Group companies and TRW of the United States, as a joint venture, with the purpose of manufacturing and selling process control systems and silicon semiconductor products, established Mitsubishi TRW Co., Ltd.
- 1966, June: Entered into an agreement (term of 10 years) with TRW for the license and exchange of technology within the space sector
- 1968, February: Joined in the space development planning for the Science and Technology Agency's National Space Development Agency of Japan, and began working in that same field of systems engineering
- 1974, October: Joint project contract with TRW ends
- 1976, June: Company name was changed to Mitsubishi Space Software Co., Ltd.
- 1978: Opened a branch in Kamakura (currently Kamakura Office) following the expansion and development of the manufacturing department
- 1982, April: Advanced into the field of communications control
- 1984, May: Opened a communications machinery manufacturing branch based in the Kansai area (currently Kansai Office) following the expansion of the communications control field operations
- 1986, July: Advanced into the field of defense systems technology
- 1988, April: Opened a system research institute (currently Kamakura Office). For the achievement of the "H-I Rocket Development", was awarded the "17th Japan Industrial Technology Grand Prize, the Prime Minister's Prize" by The Daily Industrial News (日刊工業新聞 Nikkan Kogyo Shinbun)
- 1989, January: Established affiliate company, Nippon Advanced Technology Co., Ltd.
- 1991: Advanced into the field of car navigation systems
- 1992, October: Opened a systems operations center (currently Kamakura Office)
- 1993: Advanced into the field of DNA information management utilization systems
- 1994: Advanced into the field of ETC (Electronic Toll Collection) systems
- 1995: Advanced into the field of disaster prevention systems
- 1995, April: Opened an information engineering center (currently Tsukuba Office)
- 1998: Introduced a 3-business division structure located in Tsukuba, Kamakura, and Kansai
- 2000: Expanded to doing business in Genome analysis and System integration
- 2000, July: Set up an SE base in the Tokyo area
- 2003: Advanced into the fields of security, and internet and communications
- 2004, April: Opened the Tokyo Office (at the time), and introduced a 4-business division structure located in Tokyo, Tsukuba, Kamakura, and Kansai
- 2008, October: Introduced a sales department structure
- 2009, April: Reorganized the Tokyo office, and introduced a 3-business division structure located in Tsukuba, Kamakura, and Kansai
- 2010, October: Set up a sales office in the Chubu area (Nagoya)
- 2012, February: Opened a branch in Chubu (currently Chubu Office)
- 2012, March: 50th anniversary since establishment
- 2013, April: Opened the Chubu Office in the Chubu area (Nagoya)

== Works/products ==
=== Space ===
Within the field of space development, the company, having started with developing navigation guidance technology for rockets, now conducts the development of space-related software, including artificial satellite systems development and operational support, and thermal and structural analysis.. MSS is a member of The Society of Japanese Aerospace Companies (SJAC), as well as a partner company of The Japan Aerospace Exploration Agency (JAXA), providing navigation and guidance software for various JAXA projects, such as the H-IIA. Some of the products, services, and projects the company has been involved in include:

- Satellites:
  - Daichi (ALOS)
  - Ibuki (GOSAT)
- Rockets:
  - H-I, H-II series, H-IIA, H-IIB series
  - Aircraft dynamics simulation software
  - Rocket/satellite attitude control simulation software
- Ground-based software/systems:
  - Satellite operation planning, operation evaluation software
  - Antenna control software
  - Satellite simulator
  - Tracking and control network system
  - Satellite test apparatus software
- Contracted analysis services:
  - Structural analysis (CAE) service
  - Thermal analysis (CAE) service
  - Orbital analysis (CAE) service

=== Aviation ===
In the field of aviation, the company has been involved in the verification of development processes and the analysis of safety and reliability, along with the development of domestic jet passenger aircraft, including the construction and simulation of flight dynamics models. MSS is also a member of The Japan Society for Aeronautical and Space Sciences. Some of the services the company has been involved with include:

- Domestic passenger jet development support services
- Safety and reliability analysis
- Development environment service and maintenance operations
- Development guarantee
- Flight dynamics model construction and simulation

=== Defense ===
Within the field of defense, the company develops systems and software for defense equipment, such as for radar signal processing, radar tracking, and warship weapons control simulations. Some other areas the company has been involved in include:

- Embedded software in aircraft, ships, and vehicle-mounted equipment
- Software for fire-control systems
- Strategic analysis and educational training simulation

=== Information communication systems ===
Within the field of information communication systems, the company conducts the development of advanced communication network systems for communication carriers, automotive software, software related to intelligent transportation systems, etc.

- Advanced communication network systems
- EPS steering assist control
- Car multimedia
- EV related control systems

=== Disaster prevention systems ===
Within the field of disaster prevention systems, the company conducts the support and development of systems through the research of that such as earthquake analysis/simulation, the construction of railway-related disaster prevention systems, and the distribution of earthquake early warnings. Some products/services include:

- MJ@lert (emergency earthquake information distribution service for advanced users)
- Strong earthquake observation network monitoring
- Railway earthquake disaster prevention systems
- Ground motion calculation tools, source inversion, seismic hazard maps

=== Bioinformatics ===
The company has taken part in several projects with the (then) National Institute of Agrobiological Sciences, including DNA bank system construction and operation, as well as in the fields of genome drug development and personalized medicine. Some of the products/software they have developed relating to Bioinformatics include:

- GenomeJack
- BioElephant
- BioINTEGRA
- MedRodeo
- Dr.Mirror
- siSNIPER
- MoleShaker
- BioINTEGRA PowerGene DB

==== Genome testing ====
In recent years, MSS has taken an active part in the planning of comprehensive cancer gene analysis (precision inspection), partnering with other companies and research institutions to further their research. One such instance involves being part of the creation of a Medical Genomics Japan Variant Database (MGeND), along with the Graduate School of Medicine at Kyoto University. The purpose of this database is to "provide the integrated information of genomic variations and clinical characteristics, and to improve clinical interpretation by cross-sectional studies on cancer, rare/intractable disease, infectious disease, dementia, and hearing loss." The genome analysis software developed by MSS, GenomeJack, has been used in various studies involving cancer genome testing, including a 2018 study on genome testing for pancreatic cancer where the researchers involved concluded that by using genome testing to apply precision medicine, it "will highly contribute to the development of treatment strategies..."

=== SI ===
Within the field of SI, the company conducts the construction, operation, maintenance, and analysis of basic information processing systems and networks for government agencies, local governments, private enterprises, and research institutes of natural sciences. Some of the services they provide involve:

- Big data analysis systems
- Basic information processing systems for research institutions

=== ASP/products ===
- Related to information security:
  - Dynamic MSIESER (information dissemination network forensic system)
  - Sumizumi-kun (personal information file detection tool)
  - Mail Tore (targeted threat email training)
  - Space Porter (high volume file transfer service)
- Related to medical information systems:
  - Truedia (temporal subtraction image creation software)

== Office locations ==
The company currently has 5 main offices located in Tokyo, Nagoya, Tsukuba, Kamakura, and Amagasaki. The offices are located at the following:

- Head Office: 2-4-1 Hamamatsu-cho, Minato-ku, Tokyo (WTC BLD)
- Chubu Office: 3-11-22 Meieki, Nakamura-ku, Nagoya-shi, Aichi-ken (IT MEIEKI BLD)
- Tsukuba Office: 1-6-1 Takezono, Tsukuba-shi, Ibaraki-ken (TSUKUBA MITSUI BLD)
- Kamakura Office: 792 Kamimachiya, Kamakura-shi, Kanagawa-ken (MSS FUJIZUKA BLD)
- Kansai Office: 5-4-36 Tsukaguchi Honmachi, Amagasaki-shi, Hyōgo-ken (FUJI TECHNO SQUARE)

== Subsidiaries ==
- Nippon Advanced Technology Co., Ltd. (100% of investment)
