= Cyberattacks by country =

A cyberattack is any unauthorized effort against computer infrastructure that compromises the confidentiality, integrity, or availability of its content.

== Australia ==
In 2026, the Statistics Reporting Service Portal of the Australian Medicare system was hacked by OpenAI.

== Azerbaijan ==
Hackers from Azerbaijan and Armenia have actively participated in cyber warfare as part of the Nagorno-Karabakh conflict cyber warfare over the disputed region of Nagorno-Karabakh, with Azerbaijani hackers targeting Armenian websites and posting Ilham Aliyev's statements.

== Canada ==
"Chinese state-sponsored actor" attacked a research facility in Canada in 2011. Unknown hackers attacked Canada's foreign ministry in 2022.

== China ==
China's People's Liberation Army (PLA) has developed a strategy called "Integrated Network Electronic Warfare" which guides computer network operations and cyber warfare tools. This strategy helps link together network warfare tools and electronic warfare weapons against an opponent's information systems during the conflict. They believe the fundamentals for achieving success is about seizing control of an opponent's information flow and establishing information dominance. The Science of Military and The Science of Campaigns both identify enemy logistics systems networks as the highest priority for cyberattacks and states that cyber warfare must mark the start of a campaign, used properly, can enable overall operational success. Focusing on attacking the opponent's infrastructure to disrupt transmissions and processes of information that dictate decision-making operations, the PLA would secure cyber dominance over their adversary. The predominant techniques that would be utilized during a conflict to gain the upper hand are as follows, the PLA would strike with electronic jammers, electronic deception, and suppression techniques to interrupt the transfer processes of information. They would launch virus attacks or hacking techniques to sabotage information processes, all in the hopes of destroying enemy information platforms and facilities. The PLA's Science of Campaigns noted that one role for cyber warfare is to create windows of opportunity for other forces to operate without detection or with a lowered risk of counterattack by exploiting the enemy's periods of "blindness", "deafness" or "paralysis" created by cyberattacks. That is one of the main focal points of cyber warfare, to be able to weaken your enemy to the full extent possible so that your physical offensive will have a higher percentage of success.

The PLA conducts regular training exercises in a variety of environments emphasizing the use of cyber warfare tactics and techniques in countering such tactics if it is employed against them. Faculty research has been focusing on designs for rootkit usage and detection for their Kylin Operating System which helps to further train these individuals' cyber warfare techniques. China perceives cyber warfare as a deterrent to nuclear weapons, possessing the ability for greater precision, leaving fewer casualties, and allowing for long-ranged attacks.

On March 2, 2021, Microsoft released an emergency security update to patch four security vulnerabilities that had been used by Hafnium, a Chinese nation-state-sponsored hacking group that had compromised at least 30,000 public and private Microsoft exchange servers.

In September 2022, China's National Computer Virus Emergency Response Center (CVERC) accused the NSA of carrying out a series of cyberattacks against Northwestern Polytechnical University as part of tens of thousands of “malicious network attacks” that it said the agency conducted against Chinese targets. The United States has said the university has conducted extensive military research and its department of Commerce has put the university on its entity list.

In April 2025, CVERC said the information systems for the 2025 Asian Winter Games which it hosted were subjected to more than two hundred thousand foreign cyberattacks and accused the United States of being behind most of the attacks. CVERC said that the attacks did not cause significant damage, and condemned cyberattacks targeting major international events. The allegation were made in the midst of a trade war between the US and China and after the US accused Beijing of carrying out a cyberespionage campaign that targeted US-based critics of Beijing.

== Estonia ==
The 2007 cyberattacks on Estonia were a series of cyberattacks that began on 27 April 2007 and targeted websites of Estonian organizations, including Estonian parliament, banks, ministries, newspapers, and broadcasters, amid the country's disagreement with Russia about the relocation of the Bronze Soldier of Tallinn, an elaborate Soviet-era grave marker, as well as war graves in Tallinn. The attacks triggered a number of military organizations around the world to reconsider the importance of network security to modern military doctrine. The direct result of the cyberattacks was the creation of the NATO Cooperative Cyber Defence Centre of Excellence in Tallinn.

== Ethiopia ==
In an extension of a bilateral dispute between Ethiopia and Egypt over the Grand Ethiopian Renaissance Dam, Ethiopian government websites have been hacked by the Egypt-based hackers in June 2020.

== India and Pakistan ==
There were two such instances between India and Pakistan that involved cyberspace conflicts, starting in the 1990s. Earlier cyber attacks came to be known as early as 1999. Since then, India and Pakistan were engaged in a long-term dispute over Kashmir which moved into cyberspace. Historical accounts indicated that each country's hackers have been repeatedly involved in attacking each other's computing database system. The number of attacks has grown yearly: 45 in 1999, 133 in 2000, 275 by the end of August 2001. In 2010, Indian hackers laid a cyber attack at least 36 government database websites going by the name "Indian Cyber Army". In 2013, Indian hackers hacked the official website of Election Commission of Pakistan in an attempt to retrieve sensitive database information. In retaliation, Pakistani hackers, calling themselves "True Cyber Army" hacked and defaced ~1,059 websites of Indian election bodies.

In 2013, India's Ministry of Electronics and Information Technology (MeitY) which was then known as Department of Electronics and Information Technology (DeitY), unveiled a cybersecurity policy framework called National Cyber Security Policy 2013 which officially came into effect on July 1, 2013.

According to the media, Pakistan's has been working on effective cyber security systems, in a program called the "Cyber Secure Pakistan" (CSP). The program was launched in April 2013 by the Pakistan Information Security Association and the program has expanded to country's universities.

In 2020, according to the Media reports, Pakistan Army confirms the series of Cyber Attacks that has been identified on Pakistani Government and private websites by the Indian Intelligence. ISPR also advised the government and private institutions to enhance cyber security measures.

== Indonesia ==
Indonesia said it has started to recover data that had been encrypted in a major ransomware attack in June 2024 which affected more than 160 government agencies.

The attackers identified as Brain Cipher asked for $8 million in ransom to unlock the data before later apologising and releasing the decryption key for free, according to Singapore-based cybersecurity firm StealthMole.

== Iran ==
On 8 February 2020, the telecommunication network of Iran witnessed extensive disruptions at 11:44 a.m. local time, which lasted for about an hour. The Ministry of Information and Communications Technology of Iran confirmed it as a Distributed Denial of Service attack. The Iranian authorities activated the "Digital Fortress" cyber-defense mechanism to repel. Also known as DZHAFA, it led to a drop of 75 percent in the national internet connectivity.

On the noon of 26 October 2021, a cyberattack caused all 4,300 fuel stations in Iran to disrupt and disable government-issued cards for buying subsidized fuel. This cyber attack also caused digital billboards to display messages against the Iranian government.

== Ireland ==
On 14 May 2021, the Health Service Executive (HSE) of Ireland suffered a major ransomware cyber attack which caused all of its IT systems nationwide to be shut down.

It was the most significant cybercrime attack on an Irish state agency and the largest known attack against a health service computer system. The group responsible was identified as a criminal gang known as Wizard Spider, believed to be operating from Russia. The same group is believed to have attacked Ireland's Department of Health with a similar cyber attack.

== Israel ==
In April 2020, there were attempts to hack into Israel's water infrastructure of the Sharon central region by Iran, which was thwarted by Israeli cyber defenses. The cyberattack intended to introduce dangerous levels of chlorine into the Israeli water supply.

== Italy ==
=== South Tyrol ===
In 2025, South Tyrol, Italy, experienced a significant system failure, which was later confirmed to be the result of a cyberattack. The attack targeted critical infrastructure, including emergency communication systems, leading to major disruptions in emergency response operations. Hackers issued a ransom demand following the attack. Local authorities quickly acknowledged the breach and began efforts to restore affected systems. The cause of the attack and the perpetrators are under investigation by relevant authorities.

== North Korea ==
In February 2024 UN sanctions monitors were investigating claims that dozens of cyber attacks that North Korea is suspected of carrying out has raised around $3 billion which is being used to fund and develop its nuclear weapons program.

== Norway ==
In August 2020 the Norwegian parliament Stortinget suffered a cyberattack on the email system belonging to several officials. In December 2020, the Norwegian Police Security Service said the likely perpetrators were the Russian cyber espionage group Fancy Bear.

== Russia ==
During the 2018 FIFA World Cup, Russia countered and stopped around 25 million cyber-attacks on IT Infrastructure.

In June 2019, Russia has conceded that it is "possible" its electrical grid is under cyber attack by the United States. The New York Times reported that American hackers from the United States Cyber Command planted malware potentially capable of disrupting the Russian electrical grid.

On 19 October 2020, the US justice department charged six Russian military officers of a worldwide hacking campaign, which attacked targets like French election, the 2018 Winter Olympic Games opening ceremony, US businesses and Ukraine's electricity grid. The campaign was believed to have cost billions of dollars for the mass disruption it caused.

== Ukraine ==
A series of powerful cyber attacks began 27 June 2017, that swamped websites of Ukrainian organizations, including banks, ministries, newspapers and electricity firms. In January 2022, Microsoft disclosed activity of a ransomware and DoS attack on various government agencies and organizations.

== United Arab Emirates ==
In 2019, Reuters reported that United Arab Emirates launched a series of cyberattacks on its political opponents, journalists, and human rights activists under Project Raven, on an espionage platform namely Karma. The team included ex-US intelligence agents. Project Raven commenced in 2009 and was planned to be continued for the coming ten years.

== United Kingdom ==
The NHS was greatly affected by the 2017 Wannacry ransomware attack, leading to the cancellation of at least 6,900 healthcare appointments and criticisms of cyber security standards in many NHS trusts.

In 2025, a cyberattack on the automotive company Jaguar Landrover reportedly cost the UK economy £1.9bn.

In August 2026, hackers linked to Iran shut down a power plant in the UK for four days. The government said the incident did not pose a risk to the UK electricity grid, but the name of the power plant was not disclosed for security reasons.

== United States ==
In 2015. the Office of Personnel Management (OPM) and the Interior Department were hacked, resulting in data breaches of government and security records. Numerous reports claim that Chinese hackers conducted these attacks, as the Chinese government has used hackers to attack and target U.S. military networks the year prior. In 2024, cyber-tensions remain between the United States and the People's Republic of China, as accusations of hacking the U.S. government continue to arise. Reuters claims that cyber-espionage operations have been attacking the U.S. infrastructure, including the electric grid, water plants, oil and gas pipelines, and transportation, placing an increased focus on civilian attacks. Government officials have expressed concern about these attacks, relating them to bombings that have no economic or political gain whatsoever. Though neither of the claims are confirmed by the Chinese government, U.S. officials continue to emphasize Chinese involvement in cyberattacks against their country.

During the 2016 presidential election, an indictment of 12 Russian military intelligence officers revealed that Russian hackers conducted an attack against the Clinton administration that targeted staff and campaign email addresses, following her opponent's, Donald Trump's, discernment of missing emails from Democratic servers on the same day as the attack. Robert S. Mueller, a special counsel of the United States government, claimed that the Russian government was also guilty to laundering money and stealing voter information. Furthermore, he investigated a possible conspiracy between the Russian government and Trump's possible attempt to sway the 2016 election.

In 2023, the United States Government was able to identify and stop an organized attack on numerous computers throughout the states. This attack was taken out by Volt Typhoon, a Chinese hacking group who used its ability to access computers with lowered cyber security to try and infiltrate different American systems. In April 2024, FBI Director Christopher Wray said Volt Typhoon's plan is to target the US civilian infrastructure through different cyber attacks in the future. Wray warned that China is developing the "ability to physically wreak havoc on our critical infrastructure at a time of its choosing."

In September 2024, under a court order, the FBI took control of a network of hundreds of thousands of internet routers and other devices that had been hacked by Chinese government-linked hackers who were using the massive web of hacked devices (known as botnet) to pose a threat to critical infrastructure both in the United States and abroad.
