= Donn B. Parker =

American computer scientist (1929–2021)

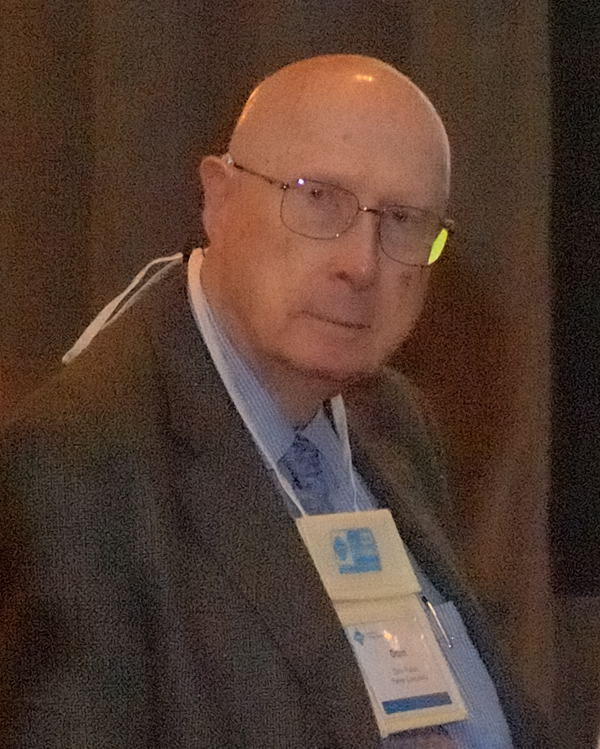
- Born: October 9, 1929; San Jose, California, U.S.
- Died: September 16, 2021 (aged 91)
- Education: University of California, Berkeley
- Scientific career
- Workplaces: General Dynamics; Control Data Corporation; SRI International

Donn B. Parker (October 9, 1929 – September 16, 2021) was an information security researcher and consultant and a 2001 Fellow of the Association for Computing Machinery. Parker had over 50 years of experience in the computer field in computer programming, computer systems management, consulting, teaching, and research.

== Early life and education ==
Parker was born in San Jose, California on October 9, 1929. He earned BA (1952) and MA (1954) degrees in mathematics from the University of California, Berkeley.

== Career ==
Parker was a senior research engineer and systems manager for General Dynamics for eight years and Control Data Corporation for eight years. He then spent several decades at SRI International working in information and computer security, retiring in 1997.

In 1998, Parker proposed the Parkerian Hexad, six atomic and orthogonal elements of information security that extend the traditional model of Confidentiality, Integrity, and Availability (the CIA triad).

He later became a retired emeritus senior consultant engaged in writing and lecturing, and his collected papers are archived at the Charles Babbage Institute at the University of Minnesota. Parker died at the age of 91 on September 22, 2021.

== Lectures ==
Parker lectured at conferences, seminars, and universities worldwide. He was the subject writer on computer crime for the Encyclopædia Britannica, Groliers Encyclopedia, Microsoft Encarta Encyclopedia, and the Encyclopedia of Computer Science. Parker lectured for the Commonwealth Club of San Francisco, Churchill Club of Silicon Valley, many universities, and the World Organization of Detectives.

== Memberships ==
Parker became active in the Association for Computing Machinery (ACM) in 1954. He was elected Secretary of the ACM from 1966 to 1970 while serving on the ACM Council from 1964 to 1974 and was chairman of the professional standards and practices committee for several years. In addition, he is a member of the Information Systems Security Association (ISSA) and is a Certified Information Systems Security Professional (CISSP). He was the consulting editor and columnist for the Journal of Information Systems Security (Auerbach) from 1994 to 1997.

Parker was involved with many other organizations. He is a grantee of the National Science Foundation, and the US Department of Justice, and was the founder in 1986 (while at SRI International) of the International Information Integrity Institute (I-4) an ongoing confidential service to large, international corporations and governments now owned and operated by KPMG-UK.

== Awards ==
In 1992, Parker received the Information Systems Security Association's Individual Achievement Award. In 1994, U.S. NIST/NSA awarded him the 1994 National Computer Systems Security Award and the Aerospace Computer Security Associates named him their Distinguished Lecturer. In 1996, he received MIS Infosecurity News' Lifetime Achievement Award.

In 1998, the Information Security Magazine profiled him as one of the top five “Infosecurity Pioneers,” and he was named to the Information Systems Security Association's Hall of Fame in 2000. In 2003, he received (ISC)²'s Harold F. Tipton Lifetime Achievement Award. In 2001 he was named a Fellow of the Association for Computing Machinery “[f]or contributions to information security and professional ethics.”

== Selected publications ==
=== Books ===
- Crime by Computer (Charles Scribner’s Sons, 1976)
- Ethical Conflicts in Computer Science and Technology (AFIPS Press, 1979)
- Fighting Computer Crime (Charles Scribner’s Sons, 1983)
- Computer Security Management (Reston Publishing, 1983)
- Ethical Conflicts in Information and Computer Science, Technology, and Business (QED Information Sciences, 1990)
- Computer Security Reference Book (Butterworth, 1993)
- Fighting Computer Crime, a New Framework for Protecting Information (John Wiley & Son, 1998)

=== Major reports ===
- Computer Abuse (SRI International, 1971)
- Criminal Justice Resource Manuals on Computer Crime published by the US Department of Justice
- Computer Security Techniques (US Government Printing Office, 1980 and 1989)
