= Lateral movement (cybersecurity) =

Cybersecurity term for attack strategies

Lateral movement refers to the techniques that cyber attackers, or threat actors, use to move progressively through a network in search of key data and assets that are the ultimate targets of their campaigns. The development of more sophisticated attack sequences has enabled threat actors to refine their strategies and better evade detection than in the past; however, much like planning a heist, cyber defenders have also learned to use lateral movement to identify attackers' locations within a network and respond more effectively to ongoing threats.

Lateral movement is a part of the ATT&CK framework within the 14 categories of Tactics, Techniques, and Procedures.
