= Elicitation technique =

Data collection techniques

An elicitation technique is a method used to obtain information, knowledge, beliefs, preferences, or requirements from people through direct interaction. Elicitation techniques are used in fields such as anthropology, cognitive science, counseling, education, knowledge engineering, linguistics, management, particularly in business intelligence contexts, philosophy, psychology, or other fields to gather knowledge or information from people. Recent work in behavioral economics has purported that elicitation techniques can be used to control subject misconceptions and mitigate errors from generally accepted experimental design practices. Elicitation, in which knowledge is sought directly from human beings, is usually distinguished from indirect methods such as gathering information from written sources. A person who interacts with human subjects in order to elicit information from them may be called an elicitor, an analyst, experimenter, or knowledge engineer, depending on the field of study.

Elicitation techniques include interviews, observation of either naturally occurring behavior (including as part of participant observation) or behavior in a laboratory setting, or the analysis of assigned tasks.

== List of elicitation techniques ==
- Interviews
- Questionnaires
- Surveys
- Focus groups
- Observation
- Participant observation
- Brainstorming
- Workshops
- Document analysis
- Prototyping
- User task analysis
- Scenario analysis
