= Kill chain (military) =

Military concept for attack sequence

The term kill chain is a military concept which identifies the structure of an attack. It consists of:

- identification of target
- dispatching of forces to target
- initiation of attack on target
- destruction of target

Conversely, the idea of "breaking" an opponent's kill chain is a method of defense or preemptive action.

== Military ==
=== F2T2EA ===
One military kill chain model is the "F2T2EA", which includes the following phases:

- Find: Identify a target. Find a target within surveillance or reconnaissance data or via intelligence means.
- Fix: Fix the target's location. Obtain specific coordinates for the target either from existing data or by collecting additional data.
- Track: Monitor the target's movement. Keep track of the target until either a decision is made not to engage the target or the target is successfully engaged.
- Target: Select an appropriate weapon or asset to use on the target to create desired effects. Apply command and control capabilities to assess the value of the target and the availability of appropriate weapons to engage it.
- Engage: Apply the weapon to the target.
- Assess: Evaluate effects of the attack, including any intelligence gathered at the location.

This is an integrated, end-to-end process described as a "chain" because an interruption at any stage can interrupt the entire process.

=== Proposed terminology ===
The "Five Fs" is a military term described by Maj. Mike "Pako" Benitez, an F-15E Strike Eagle Weapons Systems Officer who served in the United States Air Force and the United States Marine Corps.

Designed to update the Kill Chain to reflect updated, autonomous and semi-autonomous weapon systems, the "Five Fs" are described in "It's About Time: The Pressing Need to Evolve the Kill Chain" as follows:

- Find encapsulates the unity of effort of Joint Intelligence Preparation of the Operating Environment, matching collection assets to commander's intent and targeted areas of interest. This inevitably leads to detections, which may be further classified as an emerging target if it meets the intent.
- Fix is doctrinally described as "identifying an emerging target as worthy of engagement and determines its position and other data with sufficient fidelity to permit engagement."
- Fire involves committing forces or resources (i.e., releasing a munition, payload, or expendable)
- Finish involves employment with strike approval authorities (i.e., striking a target/firing directed energy/destructive electronic attack). This is similar to a ground element executing maneuvers to contact but then adhering to prescribed rules of engagement once arriving at the point of friction.
- Feedback closes the operational OODA loop with an evaluative step, in some circumstances referred to as "battle damage assessment".

=== North Korean nuclear capability ===
A new American military contingency plan called "Kill Chain" is reportedly the first step in a new strategy to use satellite imagery to identify North Korean launch sites, nuclear facilities and manufacturing capability and destroy them pre-emptively if a conflict seems imminent. The plan was mentioned in a joint statement by the United States and South Korea.

== See also ==
- Cyber kill chain
- Intelligence cycle
- List of established military terms
