= CIA triad =

Information security model based on confidentiality, integrity, and availability

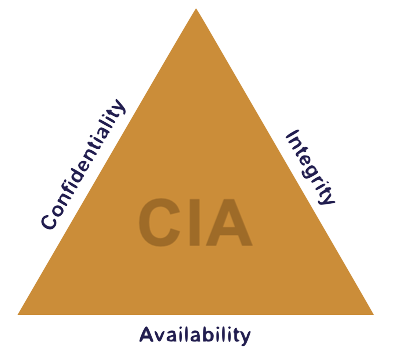
The CIA triad: confidentiality, integrity, and availability.

The "CIA triad" of confidentiality, integrity, and availability sits at the heart of many information security standards. The concept was introduced in the Anderson Report in 1972 and later repeated in The Protection of Information in Computer Systems. The abbreviation was coined by Steve Lipner (a co-signatory of the Anderson Report) around 1986.

The triad is used in information-security standards and guidance, including the ISO/IEC 27000 family of standards and the NIST Cybersecurity Framework. ISO/IEC 27000 defines information security as the preservation of confidentiality, integrity and availability of information, while other frameworks use the three concepts as part of wider approaches to managing cyber and information-security risk.

Although the CIA triad remains influential, authors have argued that it is incomplete as a general model of information security. Alternative and expanded models have proposed additional goals such as authenticity, possession or control, utility, non-repudiation, accountability and trust. These additions are sometimes presented as separate principles, and sometimes as extensions or intersections of confidentiality, integrity and availability.

== Characteristics ==
The triad is made up of confidentiality, integrity, and availability.

=== Confidentiality ===
In information security, confidentiality "is the property, that information is not made available or disclosed to unauthorized individuals, entities, or processes."Examples of confidentiality of electronic data being compromised include laptop theft, password theft, or sensitive emails being sent to the incorrect individuals.

=== Integrity ===
Data integrity refers to maintaining and assuring the accuracy and completeness of data over its entire lifecycle. This means that data cannot be modified in an unauthorized or undetected manner. Information security systems typically incorporate controls to ensure their own integrity, in particular protecting the kernel or core functions against both deliberate and accidental threats. More broadly, integrity is an information security principle that involves human/social, process, and commercial integrity, as well as data integrity. As such it touches on aspects such as credibility, consistency, truthfulness, completeness, accuracy, timeliness, and assurance.

=== Availability ===
For any information system to serve its purpose, the information must be available when it is needed. This means the computing systems used to store and process the information, the security controls used to protect it, and the communication channels used to access it must be functioning correctly. High availability systems aim to remain available at all times, preventing service disruptions due to power outages, hardware failures, and system upgrades. Ensuring availability also involves preventing denial-of-service attacks, such as a flood of incoming messages to the target system, essentially forcing it to shut down.

== Usage ==
Confidentiality, integrity and availability are explicitly invoked in both the ISO/IEC 27000 family of information security standards and the NIST Cybersecurity Framework. ISO27000 explicitly defines Information security as the "preservation of confidentiality (3.10), integrity (3.36) and availability (3.7) of information". Samonas and Cross describe it as sitting "at the heart of various security governance standards and codes of practice that have been adopted by public, private and non-governmental organizations".

== Additional goals ==
Between the early 1980s and the 2010s, at least eight complementary principles were proposed to be added by various authors, many of which either sat in the intersection of two of the existing triad or where in some sense a subfield of one of them.

Additional security attributes and their relationship to the CIA triad
Attribute	Example formulation or application	Classification by Samonas and Coss
Authenticity	The Parkerian Hexad.	Integrity
Non-repudiation	Maconachy–Schou–Ragsdale model.	Integrity
Responsibility	The RITE principles for information-security management proposed by Dhillon and Backhouse.	Integrity
Integrity of people	The RITE principles.	Integrity
Trust	The RITE principles.	Confidentiality and integrity
Ethicality	The RITE principles.	Integrity
Authentication	Maconachy–Schou–Ragsdale model.	Integrity.

Microsoft included the security goals of Authentication, Authorization, and Nonrepudiation as part of STRIDE, such that each of the six security goals correspondent to one of the six threats in the STRIDE acronym.

In 1998, Donn Parker proposed an alternative model for the classic triad that he called the six atomic elements of information. The elements are confidentiality, possession, integrity, authenticity, availability, and utility. Parker is clear that the definitions of confidentially, integrity and availability he uses are different from the ones in the standard CIA triad.

In 2011, The Open Group published the information security management standard O-ISM3. This standard proposed an operational definition of the key concepts of security, with elements called "security objectives", related to access control, availability, data quality, compliance, and technical.
