= Common Attack Pattern Enumeration and Classification =

Framework for describing and categorizing cyberattacks

The Common Attack Pattern Enumeration and Classification (CAPEC) is a catalog of known cyber security attack patterns to be used by cyber security professionals to prevent attacks.

Originally released in 2007 by the United States Department of Homeland Security, the project began as an initiative of the Office of Cybersecurity and Communication, and it is now supported by Mitre Corporation and governed under a board of corporate representatives.

== See also ==
- ATT&CK - another Mitre framework
