= List of ISO standards 26000–27999 =

This is a list of published (Note: This list generally excludes draft versions.) International Organization for Standardization (ISO) standards and other deliverables. (Note: ISO deliverables include "specifications" (ISO/PAS, ISO/TS), "reports" (ISO/TR), etc, which are not referred to by ISO as "standards".) For a complete and up-to-date list of all the ISO standards, see the ISO catalogue.

The standards are protected by copyright and most of them must be purchased. However, about 300 of the standards produced by ISO and IEC's Joint Technical Committee 1 (JTC 1) have been made freely and publicly available.

== ISO 26000 – ISO 26999 ==
- ISO 26000:2010 Guidance on social responsibility
- ISO 26101:2017 Acoustics – Test methods for the qualification of free-field environments
- ISO/TR 26122:2008 Information and documentation - Work process analysis for records
- ISO 26162 Management of terminology resources — Terminology databases
  - ISO 26162-1:2019 Part 1: Design
  - ISO 26162-2:2019 Part 2: Software
- ISO 26243:2007 Cards for staple fibres spinning – Vocabulary and principles of construction
- ISO 26261 Fireworks – Category 4
  - ISO 26261-1:2017 Part 1: Terminology
- ISO 26262 Road Vehicles - Functional Safety
- ISO 26322 Tractors for agriculture and forestry - Safety
  - ISO 26322-1:2008 Part 1: Standard tractors
  - ISO 26322-2:2010 Part 2: Narrow-track and small tractors
- ISO/IEC 26300:2006 Information technology – Open Document Format for Office Applications (OpenDocument) v1.0
- ISO 26324:2012 Information and documentation - Digital object identifier system
- ISO 26362:2009 Access panels in market, opinion and social research - Vocabulary and service requirements
- ISO 26428 Digital cinema (D-cinema) distribution master
  - ISO 26428-1:2008 Part 1: Image characteristics
  - ISO 26428-2:2008 Part 2: Audio characteristics
  - ISO 26428-3:2008 Part 3: Audio channel mapping and channel labeling
  - ISO 26428-9:2009 Part 9: Image pixel structure level 3 - Serial digital interface signal formatting
  - ISO 26428-11:2011 Part 11: Additional frame rates
  - ISO 26428-19:2011 Part 19: Serial digital interface signal formatting for additional frame rates level AFR2 and level AFR4
- ISO 26429 Digital cinema (D-cinema) packaging
  - ISO 26429-3:2008 Part 3: Sound and picture track file
  - ISO 26429-4:2008 Part 4: MXF JPEG 2000 application
  - ISO 26429-6:2008 Part 6: MXF track file essence encryption
  - ISO 26429-7:2008 Part 7: Composition playlist
  - ISO 26429-8:2009 Part 8: Packing list
  - ISO 26429-9:2009 Part 9: Asset mapping and file segmentation
  - ISO 26429-10:2009 Part 10: Stereoscopic picture track file
- ISO 26430 Digital cinema (D-cinema) operations
  - ISO 26430-1:2008 Part 1: Key delivery message
  - ISO 26430-2:2008 Part 2: Digital certificate
  - ISO 26430-3:2008 Part 3: Generic extra-theater message format
  - ISO 26430-4:2009 Part 4: Log record format specification
  - ISO 26430-5:2009 Part 5: Security log event class and constraints
  - ISO 26430-6:2009 Part 6: Auditorium security messages for intra-theater communications
  - ISO 26430-9:2009 Part 9: Key delivery bundle
- ISO 26433:2009 Digital cinema (D-cinema) - XML data types
- ISO/IEC/IEEE 26511:2011 Systems and software engineering - Requirements for managers of user documentation
- ISO/IEC/IEEE 26512:2011 Systems and software engineering - Requirements for acquirers and suppliers of user documentation
- ISO/IEC 26513:2009 Systems and software engineering - Requirements for testers and reviewers of user documentation
- ISO/IEC 26514:2008 Systems and software engineering - Requirements for designers and developers of user documentation
- ISO/IEC/IEEE 26515:2011 Systems and software engineering - Developing user documentation in an agile environment
- ISO/IEC/IEEE 26531:2015 Systems and software engineering - Content management for product life-cycle, user and service management documentation
- ISO/IEC 26550:2015 Software and systems engineering - Reference model for product line engineering and management
- ISO/IEC 26551:2016 Software and systems engineering - Tools and methods for product line requirements engineering
- ISO/IEC 26555:2015 Software and systems engineering - Tools and methods for product line technical management
- ISO/IEC 26557:2016 Software and systems engineering - Methods and tools for variability mechanisms in software and systems product line
- ISO/IEC 26558:2017 Software and systems engineering - Methods and tools for variability modelling in software and systems product line
- ISO/IEC 26559:2017 Software and systems engineering - Methods and tools for variability traceability in software and systems product line
- ISO 26683 Intelligent transport systems – Freight land conveyance content identification and communication
  - ISO 26683-1:2013 Part 1: Context, architecture and referenced standards
  - ISO 26683-2:2013 Part 2: Application interface profiles
- ISO 26684:2015 Intelligent transport systems (ITS) – Cooperative intersection signal information and violation warning systems (CIWS) – Performance requirements and test procedures
- ISO 26722:2014 Water treatment equipment for haemodialysis applications and related therapies
- ISO 26782:2009 Anaesthetic and respiratory equipment – Spirometers intended for the measurement of time forced expired volumes in humans
- ISO 26800:2011 Ergonomics - General approach, principles and concepts
- ISO 26824:2013 Particle characterization of particulate systems - Vocabulary
- ISO 26825:2008 Anaesthetic and respiratory equipment – User-applied labels for syringes containing drugs used during anaesthesia – Colours, design and performance
- ISO/IEC TR 26905:2006 Information technology – Telecommunications and information exchange between systems – Enterprise Communication in Next Generation Corporate Networks (NGCN) involving Public Next Generation Networks (NGN)
- ISO 26906:2015 Hydrometry – Fishpasses at flow measurement structures
- ISO/IEC 26907:2009 Information technology – Telecommunications and information exchange between systems – High-rate ultra-wideband PHY and MAC standard
- ISO/IEC 26908:2009 Information technology – Telecommunications and information exchange between systems – MAC-PHY interface for ISO/IEC 26907
- ISO 26909:2009 Springs - Vocabulary
- ISO/IEC 26925:2009 Information technology - Data interchange on 120 mm and 80 mm optical disk using +RW HS format - Capacity: 4,7 Gbytes and 1,46 Gbytes per side (recording speed 8X)
- ISO/IEC TR 26927:2011 Information technology – Telecommunications and information exchange between systems – Corporate telecommunication networks – Mobility for enterprise communications
- ISO/TR 26999:2012 Intelligent transport systems – Systems architecture – Use of process-oriented methodology in ITS International Standards and other deliverables

== ISO 27000 – ISO 27999 ==
- ISO/IEC 27000:2016 Information technology – Security techniques – Information security management systems – Overview and vocabulary
- ISO/IEC 27001:2022 Information technology – Security techniques – Information security management systems – Requirements
- ISO/IEC 27002:2022 Information technology – Security techniques – Code of practice for information security controls
- ISO/IEC 27003:2017 Information technology – Security techniques – Information security management systems – Guidance
- ISO/IEC 27004:2016 Information technology – Security techniques – Information security management – Monitoring, measurement, analysis and evaluation
- ISO/IEC 27005:2018 Information technology – Security techniques – Information security risk management
- ISO/IEC 27006:2015 Information technology – Security techniques – Requirements for bodies providing audit and certification of information security management systems
- ISO/IEC 27007:2017 Information technology – Security techniques – Guidelines for information security management systems auditing
- ISO/IEC TR 27008:2011 Information technology – Security techniques – Guidelines for auditors on information security controls
- ISO/IEC 27009:2016 Information technology – Security techniques – Sector-specific application of ISO/IEC 27001 – Requirements
- ISO/IEC 27010:2015 Information technology – Security techniques – Information security management for inter-sector and inter-organizational communications
- ISO/IEC 27011:2016 Information technology – Security techniques – Code of practice for Information security controls based on ISO/IEC 27002 for telecommunications organizations
- ISO/IEC 27013:2015 Information technology - Security techniques - Guidance on the integrated implementation of ISO/IEC 27001 and ISO/IEC 20000-1
- ISO/IEC 27014:2013 Information technology - Security techniques - Governance of information security
- ISO/IEC TR 27016:2014 Information technology - Security techniques - Information security management - Organizational economics
- ISO/IEC 27017:2015 Information technology - Security techniques - Code of practice for information security controls based on ISO/IEC 27002 for cloud services
- ISO/IEC 27018:2019 Information technology - Security techniques - Code of practice for protection of personally identifiable information (PII) in public clouds acting as PII processors
- ISO/IEC 27019:2017 Information technology - Security techniques - Information security management guidelines based on ISO/IEC 27002 for process control systems specific to the energy utility industry
- ISO/IEC TR 27023:2015 Information technology - Security techniques - Mapping the revised editions of ISO/IEC 27001 and ISO/IEC 27002
- ISO/IEC 27031:2011 Information technology - Security techniques - Guidelines for information and communication technology readiness for business continuity
- ISO/IEC 27032:2012 Information technology - Security techniques - Guidelines for cybersecurity
- ISO/IEC 27033 Information technology - Security techniques - Network security
  - ISO/IEC 27033-1:2015 Part 1: Overview and concepts
  - ISO/IEC 27033-2:2012 Part 2: Guidelines for the design and implementation of network security
  - ISO/IEC 27033-3:2010 Part 3: Reference networking scenarios - Threats, design techniques and control issues
  - ISO/IEC 27033-4:2014 Part 4: Securing communications between networks using security gateways
  - ISO/IEC 27033-5:2013 Part 5: Securing communications across networks using Virtual Private Networks (VPNs)
  - ISO/IEC 27033-6:2016 Part 6: Securing wireless IP network access
- ISO/IEC 27034 Information technology - Security techniques - Application security
  - ISO/IEC 27034-1:2011 Part 1: Overview and concepts
  - ISO/IEC 27034-2:2015 Part 2: Organization normative framework
  - ISO/IEC 27034-6:2016 Part 6: Case studies
- ISO/IEC 27035 Information technology - Security techniques - Information security incident management
  - ISO/IEC 27035-1:2016 Part 1: Principles of incident management
  - ISO/IEC 27035-2:2016 Part 2: Guidelines to plan and prepare for incident response
- ISO/IEC 27036 Information technology - Security techniques - Information security for supplier relationships
  - ISO/IEC 27036-1:2014 Part 1: Overview and concepts
  - ISO/IEC 27036-2:2014 Part 2: Requirements
  - ISO/IEC 27036-3:2013 Part 3: Guidelines for information and communication technology supply chain security
  - ISO/IEC 27036-4:2016 Part 4: Guidelines for security of cloud services
- ISO/IEC 27037:2012 Information technology – Security techniques – Guidelines for identification, collection, acquisition and preservation of digital evidence
- ISO/IEC 27038:2014 Information technology - Security techniques - Specification for digital redaction
- ISO/IEC 27039:2015 Information technology - Security techniques - Selection, deployment and operations of intrusion detection and prevention systems (IDPS)
- ISO/IEC 27040:2015 Information technology - Security techniques - Storage security
- ISO/IEC 27041:2015 Information technology - Security techniques - Guidance on assuring suitability and adequacy of incident investigative method
- ISO/IEC 27042:2015 Information technology - Security techniques - Guidelines for the analysis and interpretation of digital evidence
- ISO/IEC 27043:2015 Information technology - Security techniques - Incident investigation principles and processes
- ISO/IEC 27050 Information technology - Security techniques - Electronic discovery
  - ISO/IEC 27050-1:2016 Part 1: Overview and concepts
- ISO 27185:2012 Cardiac rhythm management devices - Symbols to be used with cardiac rhythm management device labels, and information to be supplied - General requirements
- ISO 27186:2010 Active implantable medical devices – Four-pole connector system for implantable cardiac rhythm management devices – Dimensional and test requirements
- ISO 27327 Fans – Air curtain units
  - ISO 27327-2:2014 Part 2: Laboratory methods of testing for sound power
- ISO 27427:2013 Anaesthetic and respiratory equipment – Nebulizing systems and components
- ISO 27500:2016 The human-centred organization — Rationale and general principles
- ISO/TS 27527:2010 Health informatics – Provider identification
- ISO/IEC 27551:2021 Information security, cybersecurity and privacy protection — Requirements for attribute-based unlinkable entity authentication
- ISO 27668 Gel ink ball pens and refills
  - ISO 27668-1:2017 Part 1: General use
  - ISO 27668-2:2009 Part 2: Documentary use (DOC)
- ISO/TS 27687:2008 Nanotechnologies – Terminology and definitions for nano-objects – Nanoparticle, nanofibre and nanoplate [Withdrawn: replaced with ISO/TS 80004-2:2015]
- ISO/IEC 27701:2019 Security techniques — Extension to ISO/IEC 27001 and ISO/IEC 27002 for privacy information management — Requirements and guidelines
- ISO 27729:2012 Information and documentation - International standard name identifier (ISNI)
- ISO 27730:2012 Information and documentation - International standard collection identifier (ISCI)
- ISO 27789:2013 Health informatics – Audit trails for electronic health records
- ISO/TS 27790:2009 Health informatics – Document registry framework
- ISO 27799:2016 Health informatics—Information security management in health using ISO/IEC 27002
- ISO/TR 27809:2007 Health informatics – Measures for ensuring patient safety of health software
- ISO/HL7 27931:2009 Data Exchange Standards – Health Level Seven Version 2.5 – An application protocol for electronic data exchange in healthcare environments
- ISO/HL7 27932:2009 Data Exchange Standards – HL7 Clinical Document Architecture, Release 2
- ISO/HL7 27951:2009 Health informatics – Common terminology services, release 1
- ISO/HL7 27953 Health informatics – Individual case safety reports (ICSRs) in pharmacovigilance
  - ISO/HL7 27953-1:2011 Part 1: Framework for adverse event reporting
  - ISO/HL7 27953-2:2011 Part 2: Human pharmaceutical reporting requirements for ICSR
- ISO 27991:2008 Ships and marine technology - Marine evacuation systems - Means of communication
