= ISO/IEC 27018 =

IT privacy and security standard

ISO/IEC 27018 Information technology — Security techniques — Code of practice for protection of personally identifiable information (PII) in public clouds acting as PII processors is a privacy standard, part of the ISO/IEC 27000 family of standards. It was among the first international standards about privacy in cloud computing services. It is based on ISO/IEC 27002. It helps cloud service providers who process personally identifiable information (PII) to assess risk and implement controls for protecting PII. It was published by the International Organization for Standardization (ISO) and the International Electrotechnical Commission (IEC) under the joint ISO and IEC subcommittee, ISO/IEC JTC 1/SC 27.

== Standard Versions ==
There have been three editions of this standard so far:

- ISO/IEC 27018:2014
- ISO/IEC 27018:2019
- ISO/IEC 27018:2025

== Structure of the standard ==
ISO/IEC 27018:2019 has eighteen sections, plus a long annex, which cover:

1. Scope
2. Normative References
3. Terms and definitions
4. Overview
5. Information security policies
6. Organization of information security
7. Human resource security
8. Asset management
9. Access control
10. Cryptography
11. Physical and environmental security
12. Operations security
13. Communications security
14. System acquisition, development and maintenance
15. Supplier relationships
16. Information security incident management
17. Information security aspects of business continuity management
18. Compliance

== Objectives ==
When used in conjunction with the information security controls in ISO/IEC 27002, ISO/IEC 27018 suggests a set of security controls that can be implemented by a public cloud computing service provider acting as a PII processor.

The objectives of the standard are to:

- Help the public cloud service provider to comply with applicable obligations when acting as a PII processor, whether such obligations fall on the PII processor directly or through contract.
- Enable the public cloud PII processor to be transparent in relevant matters so that cloud service customers can select well-governed cloud-based PII processing services.
- Assist the cloud service customer and the public cloud PII processor in entering into a contractual agreement.
- Provide cloud service customers with a mechanism for exercising audit and compliance rights and responsibilities in cases where individual cloud service customer audits of data hosted in a multiparty, virtualized server (cloud) environment can be impractical technically and can increase risks to those physical and logical network security controls in place.

== Advantages ==
Using this standard has the following advantages:

- It provides a higher security to customer data and information.
- It makes the platform more reliable to the customer, achieving a higher level than the competition.
- Faster enablement of global operations.
- Streamlined contracts.
- It provides legal protections for cloud providers and users.
