= Verinice =

verinice
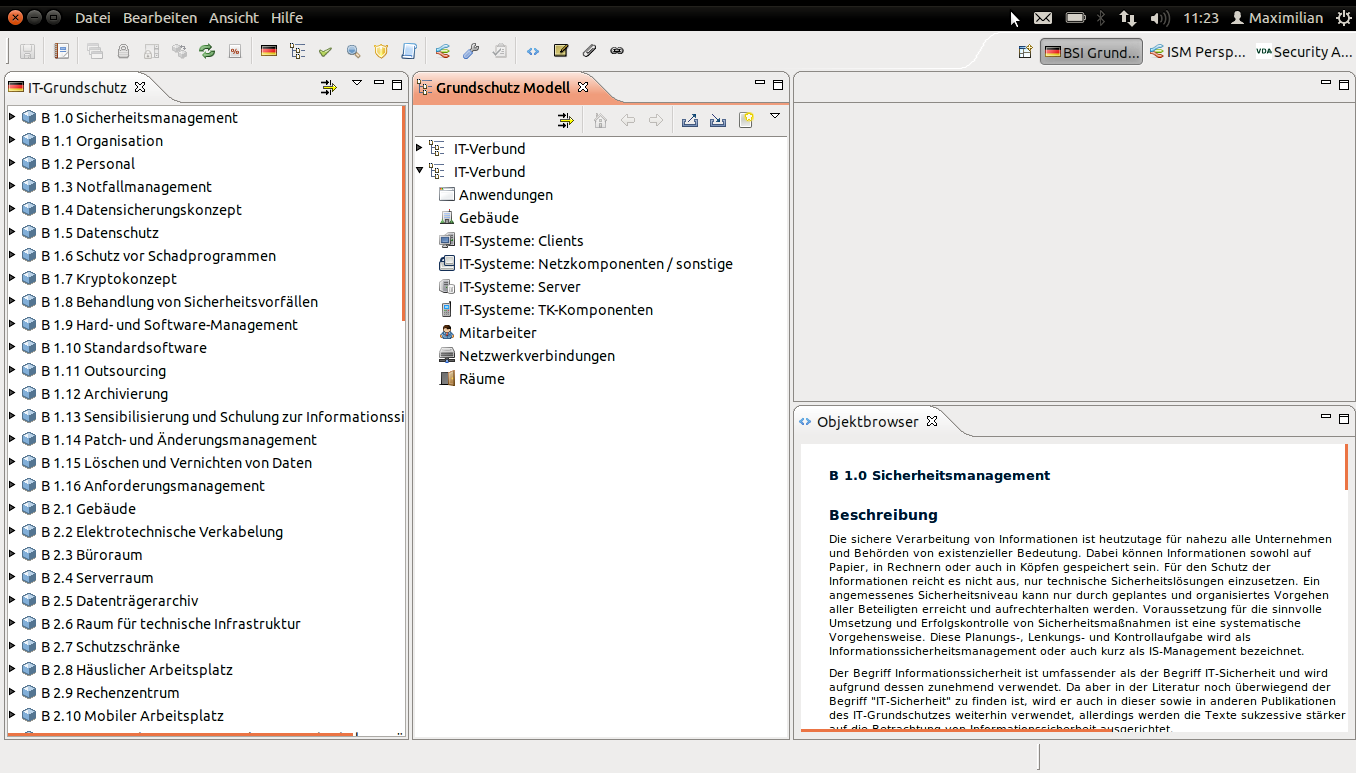
- Developer: SerNet Service Network GmbH
- Stable release: 1.28.0 / January 30, 2025
- Written in: Java
- Operating system: Cross-platform
- Type: Information security management system
- License: //creativecommons.org/licenses/by-nd/3.0/de/
- Website: verinice.com

Verinice is a free and open source information security management system (ISMS) application which can help in creating and maintaining systems for information and security management.

Verinice was written and is maintained primarily by a German company named SerNet Service Network GmbH.

Verinice is licensed under GNU General Public License (version 3 or later).

Its main users are usually small and medium companies, some big enterprises and government agencies.

In Germany, Verinice is the recommended ISMS tool from German Association of the Automotive Industry (VDA) for its members like Volkswagen, Daimler AG, Fiat and other big manufacturers. VDA is also sponsoring Verinice development since release 1.2.

Verinice supports the operating systems Windows, Linux and OS X and has licensed the IT Baseline Protection Catalogs from the Federal Office for Information Security.

Version	Release date
Verinice 1.0	23.09.2009
Verinice 1.1	23.05.2010
Verinice 1.2	16.11.2010
Verinice 1.3	14.04.2011
Verinice 1.4	21.10.2011
Verinice 1.5	25.01.2012
Verinice 1.6	16.11.2012
Verinice 1.6.1	18.01.2013
Verinice 1.6.2	28.05.2013
Verinice 1.6.3	19.09.2013
Verinice 1.7.0	09.05.2014
Verinice 1.8	01.08.2014
Verinice 1.9	21.11.2014
Verinice 1.10	29.05.2015
Verinice 1.11	28.08.2015
Verinice 1.12	17.02.2016
Verinice 1.13	12.10.2016
Verinice 1.13.1	19.12.2016
Verinice 1.14	10.07.2017
Verinice 1.15	01.02.2018
Verinice 1.16	17.04.2018
Verinice 1.17	12.11.2018
Verinice 1.17.1	28.11.2018
Verinice 1.18	11.04.2019
Verinice 1.18.1	04.07.2019
Verinice 1.19	11.11.2019
Verinice 1.19.1	05.12.2019
Verinice 1.20	14.04.2020
Verinice 1.21	November 2020
Verinice 1.22.1	March 2021
Verinice 1.22.2	August 2021
Verinice 1.23	October 2021
Verinice 1.23.1	November 2021
Verinice 1.26.1	July 2023
Verinice 1.28.0	30.01.2025

== Other tools for creating ISMS ==
- CertVision NormTracker
- HiScout GRC Suite
- GS Tool
- SecuMax
- CRISAM
- ibi systems iris
- eramba
