= ISO/IEC 27019 =

ISO/IEC TR 27019 is a security standard, part of the ISO/IEC 27000 family of standards. It was published by the International Organization for Standardization (ISO) and the International Electrotechnical Commission (IEC) under the joint ISO and IEC subcommittee, ISO/IEC JTC 1/SC 27.

It is based on ISO/IEC 27002, but it is applied for energy management (to control generation, transmission, storage and distribution of electric power) and for the control of associated supporting processes. It is not applied to the process control of nuclear facilities and it is not applied to telecommunication systems and components used in the process control environment. ISO/IEC TR 27019 first version was published in July 2013. and its latest version was published on November 27 of 2017.

== Versions ==
The standard has three versions:

- ISO/IEC 27019:2013
- ISO/IEC 27019:2017
- ISO/IEC 27019:2024
