= Standard of Good Practice for Information Security =

The 2011 Standard of Good Practice

The Standard of Good Practice for Information Security (SOGP), published by the Information Security Forum (ISF), is a business-focused, practical and comprehensive guide to identifying and managing information security risks in organizations and their supply chains.

The most recent public edition is 2024, an update of the 2022 edition. The 2024 edition is the first that has incremental updates via the ISF Live website, ahead of its biennial refresh due in 2026. The 2026 edition has launched exclusively to ISF Members and is advertised as launching “later this year”.

Upon release, the 2011 Standard was the most significant update of the standard for four years. It covers information security 'hot topics' such as consumer devices, critical infrastructure, cybercrime attacks, office equipment, spreadsheets and databases and cloud computing.

The Standard is aligned with the requirements for an Information Security Management System (ISMS) set out in ISO/IEC 27000-series standards, and provides wider and deeper coverage of ISO/IEC 27002 control topics, as well as cloud computing, information leakage, consumer devices and security governance.

In addition to providing a tool to enable ISO 27001 certification, the Standard provides alignment matrices to with other relevant standards and legislation such as PCI DSS and the NIST Cyber Security Framework, to enable compliance with these standards too.

The Standard is used by Chief Information Security Officers (CISOs), information security managers, business managers, IT managers, internal and external auditors, IT service providers in organizations of all sizes.

The Standard is available free of charge to members of the ISF. Non-members are able to purchase a copy of the standard directly from the ISF.

== Organization ==
The Standard has historically been organized into six categories, or aspects. Computer Installations and Networks address the underlying IT infrastructure on which Critical Business Applications run. The End-User Environment covers the arrangements associated with protecting corporate and workstation applications at the endpoint in use by individuals. Systems Development deals with how new applications and systems are created, and Security Management addresses high-level direction and control.

The Standard is now primarily published in a simple "modular" format that eliminates redundancy. For example, the various sections devoted to security audit and review have been consolidated.

Aspect	Focus	Target audience	Issues probed	Scope and coverage
Security Management (enterprise-wide)	Security management at enterprise level.	The target audience of the SM aspect will typically include: Heads of information security functions; Information security managers (or equivalent); IT auditors	The commitment provided by top management to promoting good information security practices across the enterprise, along with the allocation of appropriate resources.	Security management arrangements within: A group of companies (or equivalent); Part of a group (e.g. subsidiary company or a business unit); An individual organization (e.g. a company or a government department)
Critical Business Applications	A business application that is critical to the success of the enterprise.	The target audience of the CB aspect will typically include: Owners of business applications; Individuals in charge of business processes that are dependent on applications; Systems integrators; Technical staff, such as members of an application support team.	The security requirements of the application and the arrangements made for identifying risks and keeping them within acceptable levels.	Critical business applications of any: Type (including transaction processing, process control, funds transfer, customer service, and workstation applications); Size (e.g. applications supporting thousands of users or just a few)
Computer Installations	A computer installation that supports one or more business applications.	The target audience of the CI aspect will typically include: Owners of computer installations; Individuals in charge of running data centers; IT managers; Third parties that operate computer installations for the organization; IT auditors	How requirements for computer services are identified; and how the computers are set up and run in order to meet those requirements.	Computer installations: Of all sizes (including the largest mainframe, server-based systems, and groups of workstations); Running in specialized environments (e.g. a purpose-built data center), or in ordinary working environments (e.g. offices, factories, and warehouses)
Networks	A network that supports one or more business applications	The target audience of the NW aspect will typically include: Heads of specialist network functions; Network managers; Third parties that provide network services (e.g. Internet service providers); IT auditors	How requirements for network services are identified; and how the networks are set up and run in order to meet those requirements.	Any type of communications network, including: Wide area networks (WANs) or local area networks (LANs); Large scale (e.g. enterprise-wide) or small scale (e.g. an individual department or business unit); Those based on Internet technology such as intranets or extranets; Voice, data, or integrated
Systems Development	A systems development unit or department, or a particular systems development project.	The target audience of the SD aspect will typically include: Heads of systems development functions; System developers; IT auditors	How business requirements (including information security requirements) are identified; and how systems are designed and built to meet those requirements.	Development activity of all types, including: Projects of all sizes (ranging from many worker-years to a few worker-days); Those conducted by any type of developer (e.g. specialist units or departments, outsourcers, or business users); Those based on tailor-made software or application packages
End User Environment	An environment (e.g. a business unit or department) in which individuals use corporate business applications or critical workstation applications to support business processes.	The target audience of the UE aspect will typically include: Business managers; Individuals in the end-user environment; Local information-security coordinators; Information-security managers (or equivalent)	The arrangements for user education and awareness; use of corporate business applications and critical workstation applications; and the protection of information associated with mobile computing.	End-user environments: Of any type (e.g. corporate department, general business unity, factory floor, or call center); Of any size (e.g. several individuals to groups of hundreds or thousands); That include individuals with varying degrees of IT skills and awareness of information security.

The six aspects within the Standard are composed of a number of areas, each covering a specific topic. An area is broken down further into sections, each of which contains detailed specifications of information security best practice. Each statement has a unique reference. For example, SM41.2 indicates that a specification is in the Security Management aspect, area 4, section 1, and is listed as specification No. 2 within that section.

The Principles and Objectives part of the Standard provides a high-level version of the Standard, by bringing together just the principles (which provide an overview of what needs to be performed to meet the Standard) and objectives (which outline the reason why these actions are necessary) for each section.

The published Standard also includes an extensive topics matrix, index, introductory material, background information, suggestions for implementation, and other information.

== See also ==
See Category:Computer security for a list of all computing and information-security related articles.

- Cyber security standards
- Information Security Forum
- COBIT
- Committee of Sponsoring Organizations of the Treadway Commission (COSO)
- ISO 17799
- ISO/IEC 27002
- ITIL
- Payment Card Industry Data Security Standard (PCI DSS)
- Basel III
- Cloud Security Alliance (CSA) for cloud computing security
