= ISO/IEC 27000 family =

Information security standards

The ISO/IEC 27000 family (also known as the 'ISMS Family of Standards', 'ISO27K', or 'ISO 27000 series') comprises information security standards published jointly by the International Organization for Standardization (ISO) and the International Electrotechnical Commission (IEC).

The series provides best practice recommendations on information security management—the management of information risks through information security controls—within the context of an overall information security management system (ISMS), similar in design to management systems for quality assurance (the ISO 9000 series), environmental protection (the ISO 14000 series) and other management systems.

The series is deliberately broad in scope, covering more than just privacy, confidentiality and IT security issues. It is applicable to organizations of all shapes and sizes. All organizations are encouraged to assess their information risks, then treat them (typically using information security controls) according to their needs, using the guidance and suggestions where relevant. Given the dynamic nature of information risk and security, the ISMS concept incorporates continuous feedback and improvement activities to respond to changes in the threats, vulnerabilities or impacts of Incidents.

The standards are the product of ISO/IEC JTC 1 (Joint Technical Committee 1) SC 27 (Subcommittee 27), an international body that meets in person (face-to-face or virtually) twice a year.

The ISO/IEC standards are sold directly by ISO, mostly in English, French and Chinese. Sales outlets associated with various national standards bodies also sell faithfully translated versions in several languages.

== Early history ==
Many people and organisations are involved in the development and maintenance of the ISO27K standards. The first standard in this series was ISO/IEC 17799:2000; this was a fast-tracking of the existing British standard BS 7799 part 1:1999. The initial release of BS 7799 was based, in part, on an information security policy manual developed by the Royal Dutch/Shell Group in the late 1980s and early 1990s. In 1993, what was then the Department of Trade and Industry (United Kingdom) convened a team to review existing practice in information security, with the goal of producing a standards document. In 1995, the BSI Group published the first version of BS 7799. One of the principal authors of BS 7799 recalls that, at the beginning of 1993, "The DTI decided to quickly assemble a group of industry representatives from seven different sectors: Shell ([David Lacey] and Les Riley), BOC Group (Neil Twist), BT (Dennis Willets), Marks & Spencer (Steve Jones), Midland Bank (Richard Hackworth), Lloyds Bank, Nationwide (John Bowles) and Unilever (Rolf Moulton)." David Lacey credits the late Donn B. Parker as having the "original idea of establishing a set of information security controls", and with producing a document containing a "collection of around a hundred baseline controls" by the late 1980s for "the I-4 Information Security circle which he conceived and founded.

== Publications ==
The published ISO27K standards related to "information security, cybersecurity and privacy protection" are:

1. ISO/IEC 27000 — Information security management systems — Overview and vocabulary
2. ISO/IEC 27001 — Information security, cybersecurity and privacy protection — Information security management systems — Requirements.: formally specifies an information security management system in the same structured and succinct manner as other ISO management systems standards, facilitating conformity auditing and certification.
3. ISO/IEC 27002 — Information security, cybersecurity and privacy protection — Information security controls: essentially a structured and detailed catalog of information security controls that might be managed through the ISMS.
4. ISO/IEC 27003 — Information security management system - Guidance: advice on using ISO/IEC 27001 and related standards to build and implement an information security management system.
5. ISO/IEC 27004 — Information security management — Monitoring, measurement, analysis and evaluation: concerns the use of measurements or measures for information security management (more commonly known as "security metrics").
6. ISO/IEC 27005 — Guidance on managing information security risks: guidance on identifying, analysing, evaluating and treating risks to the security of information.
7. ISO/IEC 27006-1 — Requirements for bodies providing audit and certification of information security management systems: an accreditation standard that specifies how certification bodies should audit an ISMS for conformity with ISO/IEC 27001.
8. ISO/IEC 27006-2 - Requirements for bodies providing audit and certification of information security management systems — Part 2: Privacy information management systems: an accreditation standard that specifies how certification bodies should audit a PIMS for conformity with ISO/IEC 27701.
9. ISO/IEC 27007 — Guidelines for information security management systems auditing: focuses on auditing the management system elements of an ISMS
10. ISO/IEC TS 27008 — Guidance for the assessment of information security controls: focuses on technical checks on the information security controls being managed using an ISMS
11. ISO/IEC 27009 — Sector-specific application of ISO/IEC 27001 — Requirements: guidance for anyone developing ‘sector-specific’ standards based on or relating to ISO/IEC 27001, where ‘sector’ means “domain, application area or market sector”.
12. ISO/IEC 27010 — Information security management for inter-sector and inter-organizational communications: guidance on sharing information about information risks, security controls, issues and/or incidents that span industry sectors and/or nations, particularly those affecting critical infrastructure.
13. ISO/IEC 27011 — Information security controls based on ISO/IEC 27002 for telecommunications organizations: an ISMS implementation guide for the telecomms industry.
14. ISO/IEC 27013 — Guidance on the integrated implementation of ISO/IEC 27001 and ISO/IEC 20000-1: brings together the management systems for information security and IT services.
15. ISO/IEC 27014 — Governance of information security: Mahncke assessed this standard in the context of Australian e-health.)
16. ISO/IEC TR 27015 — Information security management guidelines for financial services (now withdrawn)
17. ISO/IEC TR 27016 — Organisational economics: concerns the financial and resourcing aspects of managing information risks and security controls.
18. ISO/IEC 27017 — Code of practice for information security controls based on ISO/IEC 27002 for cloud services: guidance on information security for cloud services.
19. ISO/IEC 27018 — Code of practice for protection of personally identifiable information (PII) in public clouds acting as PII processors: aimed at the likes of Amazon and Google, suggesting information security controls to protect their clients' data privacy.
20. ISO/IEC 27019 — Information security controls for the energy utility industry: guides non-nuclear electricity companies (and the like) to secure industrial process control or operational technology systems.
21. ISO/IEC 27021 — Competence requirements for information security management systems professionals: elaborates on the knowledge and expertise required of information security professionals.
22. ISO/IEC TS 27022 — Guidance on information security management system processes: a process reference model, describing an ISMS as an integrated suite of processes.
23. ISO/IEC TR 27024 — Government and regulatory use of ISO/IEC 27001, ISO/IEC 27002 and other information security standards: dentifies laws, regulations and guidelines that reference the ISO27k standards.
24. ISO/IEC TS 27028 — Guidance on ISO/IEC 27002 attributes: explains and elaborates on the categorisation of information security controls into types such as preventive, detective and/or corrective.
25. ISO/IEC 27031 — Guidelines for information and communication technology readiness for business continuity: guidance on the use of Information and Communication Technology to ensure business continuity.
26. ISO/IEC 27032 — Guideline for Internet security: application of network security controls to protect Internet-related services and systems.
27. ISO/IEC 27033-1 — Network security – Part 1: Overview and concepts.
28. ISO/IEC 27033-2 — Network security – Part 2: Guidelines for the design and implementation of network security.
29. ISO/IEC 27033-3 — Network security – Part 3: Reference networking scenarios — Threats, design techniques and control issues.
30. ISO/IEC 27033-4 — Network security – Part 4: Securing communications between networks using security gateways.
31. ISO/IEC 27033-5 — Network security – Part 5: Securing communications across networks using Virtual Private Networks (VPNs).
32. ISO/IEC 27033-6 — Network security – Part 6: Securing wireless IP network access.
33. ISO/IEC 27033-7 — Network security – Part 7: Guidelines for network virtualization security.
34. ISO/IEC 27034-1 — Application security – Part 1: Overview and concepts.
35. ISO/IEC 27034-2 — Application security – Part 2: Organization normative framework.
36. ISO/IEC 27034-3 — Application security – Part 3: Application security management process.
37. ISO/IEC 27034-5 — Application security – Part 5: Protocols and application security controls data structure
38. ISO/IEC 27034-5-1 — Application security – Part 5-1: Protocols and applications security controls data, XML schemas.
39. ISO/IEC 27034-6 — Application security – Part 6: Case studies.
40. ISO/IEC 27034-7 — Application security – Part 7: Assurance prediction framework.
41. ISO/IEC 27035-1 — Information security incident management – Part 1: Principles and process.
42. ISO/IEC 27035-2 — Information security incident management – Part 2: Guidelines to plan and prepare for incident response.
43. ISO/IEC 27035-3 — Information security incident management – Part 3: Guidelines for ICT incident response operations.
44. ISO/IEC 27035-4 — Information security incident management – Part 4: Coordination.
45. ISO/IEC 27036-1 — Information security for supplier relationships – Part 1: Overview and concepts: the '27036 standards covers the IT side of supply chain security.
46. ISO/IEC 27036-2 — Information security for supplier relationships – Part 2: Requirements.
47. ISO/IEC 27036-3 — Information security for supplier relationships – Part 3: Guidelines for hardware, software, and services supply chain security.
48. ISO/IEC 27036-4 — Information security for supplier relationships – Part 4: Guidelines for security of cloud services.
49. ISO/IEC 27037 — Guidelines for identification, collection, acquisition and preservation of digital evidence: an electronic or digital forensics standard.
50. ISO/IEC 27038 — Specification for digital redaction: how to redact sensitive content from digital documents.
51. ISO/IEC 27039 — Selection, deployment and operation of intrusion detection and prevention systems (IDPS).
52. ISO/IEC 27040 — Storage security.
53. ISO/IEC 27041 — Guidance on assuring suitability and adequacy of incident investigative method.
54. ISO/IEC 27042 — Guidelines for the analysis and interpretation of digital evidence: another eForensics standard.
55. ISO/IEC 27043 — Incident investigation principles and processes: another eForensics standard.
56. ISO/IEC 27045 — Big data and privacy — Processes.
57. ISO/IEC 27046 — Big data security and privacy — Implementation guidelines.
58. ISO/IEC 27050-1 — Electronic discovery — Part 1: Overview and concepts: more eForensics standards.
59. ISO/IEC 27050-2 — Electronic discovery — Part 2: Guidance for governance and management of electronic discovery: another eForensics standard.
60. ISO/IEC 27050-3 — Electronic discovery — Part 3: Code of practice for electronic discovery: another eForensics standard.
61. ISO/IEC 27050-4 — Electronic discovery — Part 4: Technical readiness: another eForensics standard.
62. ISO/IEC 27070 — Requirements for establishing virtualized roots of trust.
63. ISO/IEC 27071 — Security recommendations for establishing trusted connections between devices and services.
64. ISO/IEC 27090 — Guidance for addressing security threats to artificial intelligence systems.
65. ISO/IEC 27091 — Artificial intelligence — Privacy protection.
66. ISO/IEC 27099 — Public key infrastructure — Practices and policy framework.
67. ISO/IEC 27100 — Cybersecurity — Overview and concepts.
68. ISO/IEC 27102 — Guidelines for cyber-insurance.
69. ISO/IEC TR 27103 — Cybersecurity and ISO and IEC standards.
70. ISO/IEC TR 27109 — Cybersecurity education and training.
71. ISO/IEC TS 27110 — Information technology, cybersecurity and privacy protection — Cybersecurity framework development guidelines.
72. ISO/IEC TS 27115 — Cybersecurity evaluation of complex systems — Introduction and framework overview: a proposed new ISO27k standard.
73. ISO/IEC 27400 — IoT security and privacy — Guidelines.
74. ISO/IEC 27402 — IoT security and privacy — Device baseline requirements.
75. ISO/IEC 27403 — IoT security and privacy — Guidelines for IoT-domotics.
76. ISO/IEC 27404 — IoT security and privacyy — Cybersecurity labelling framework for consumer IoT.
77. ISO/IEC TR 27550 — Privacy engineering for system life cycle processes.
78. ISO/IEC 27551 — Requirements for attribute-based unlinkable entity authentication.
79. ISO/IEC 27553-1 — Security and privacy requirements for authentication using biometrics on mobile devices — Part 1: Local modes.
80. ISO/IEC 27553-2 — Security and privacy requirements for authentication using biometrics on mobile devices — Part 1: remote modes.
81. ISO/IEC 27554 — Application of ISO 31000 for assessment of identity-related risk.
82. ISO/IEC 27555 — Guidelines on personally identifiable information deletion.
83. ISO/IEC 27556 — User-centric privacy preferences management framework.
84. ISO/IEC 27557 — Application of ISO 31000:2018 for organizational privacy risk management.
85. ISO/IEC 27559 — Privacy-enhancing data de-identification framework.
86. ISO/IEC TS 27560 — Privacy technologies — Consent record information structure.
87. ISO/IEC 27561 — Privacy operationalisation model and method for engineering (POMME).
88. ISO/IEC 27562 — Privacy guidelines for fintech services.
89. ISO/IEC TR 27563 — Security and privacy in artificial intelligence use cases — Best practices.
90. ISO/IEC TS 27564 — Guidance on the use of model for privacy engineering.
91. ISO/IEC 27565 — Guidelines on privacy preservation based on zero knowledge proofs.
92. ISO/IEC 27566-1 — Age assurance systems — Part 1 — Framework.
93. ISO/IEC 27566-2 — Age assurance systems — Part 2 — Technical approaches and guidance for implementation.
94. ISO/IEC 27566-3 — Age assurance systems — Part 3 — Benchmarks for benchmark analysis.
95. ISO/IEC TS 27570 — Privacy guidelines for smart cities.
96. ISO/IEC 27701 — Extension to ISO/IEC 27001 and to ISO/IEC 27002 for privacy Information management — Requirements and guidelines.
97. ISO 27799 — Information security management in health using ISO/IEC 27002: guides health industry organizations on how to protect personal health information using ISO/IEC 27002).

=== Standards lifecycle ===
- Several of the ISO27K standards listed above are in preparation, while the released ISO27K standards are routinely reviewed and if appropriate updated every five years or so.
- Occasionally, standards are retired or withdrawn when they are no longer relevant.

== See also ==
- ISO/IEC JTC 1/SC 27 - IT Security techniques
- BS 7799, the original British Standard from which ISO/IEC 17799, ISO/IEC 27002 and ISO/IEC 27001 were derived
- Document management system
- Sarbanes–Oxley Act
- Standard of Good Practice for Information Security published by the Information Security Forum
