= ISO 19011 =

International standard

ISO 19011 is an international standard that sets forth guidelines for management systems auditing. The current version is ISO 19011:2026. It is developed by the International Organization for Standardization (ISO).

Originally it was published in 1990 as ISO 10011-1 and in 2002 took the current ISO 19011 numbering.

The standard offers four resources to organisations to "save time, effort and money":

- A clear explanation of the principles of management systems auditing.
- Guidance on the management of audit programs.
- Guidance on the conduct of internal or external audits.
- Advice on the competence and evaluation of auditors.

Seven Principles of Auditing

- Integrity: The foundation of professionalism; perform work ethically, honestly, and responsibly.
- Fair presentation: Report audit findings and conclusions truthfully and accurately.
- Due professional care: Exercise diligence and reasoned judgement during auditing.
- Confidentiality: Exercise discretion and protect sensitive information.
- Independence: Remain unbiased and objective throughout the audit process.
- Evidence-based approach: Reach reliable, verifiable conclusions using systematic sampling.
- Risk-based approach: Consider risks and opportunities during planning, conducting, and reporting.

Core Components

- Audit Program Management: Establishing objectives, assessing risks to the program, and assigning resources.
- Conducting the Audit: Initiating, preparing the plan, performing on-site or remote activities, and reporting findings.
- Auditor Competence: Evaluating personal behaviour, knowledge, and skills required for specific audits.
- Note on Certification: Organisations cannot be "ISO 19011 certified" because it is a guidance standard, not a requirement specification.

== History ==
Year	Description
1990	ISO 10011-1 (1st Edition)
2002	ISO 19011 (2nd Edition)
2011	ISO 19011 (3rd Edition)
2018	ISO 19011 (4th Edition)
2026	ISO 19011 (4th Edition)

== See also ==
- ISO 9001
- ISO 14001
- ISO/IEC 27001
- ISO 45001
