= ISO/IEC 27000 =

Information security management system standard

ISO/IEC 27000 is one of the standards in the ISO/IEC 27000 series of information security management systems (ISMS)-related standards. The formal title for ISO/IEC 27000 is Information technology — Security techniques — Information security management systems — Overview and vocabulary.

The standard was developed by subcommittee 27 (SC27) of the first Joint Technical Committee (JTC1) of the International Organization for Standardization (ISO) and International Electrotechnical Commission (IEC).

ISO/IEC 27000 provides:

- An overview of, and introduction to, the entire ISO/IEC 27000 series.
- A formally defined glossary or vocabulary of the specialist terms used throughout the ISO/IEC 27000 series.

ISO/IEC 27000 is available for free via the ITTF website.

== Overview and introduction ==
The standard describes the purpose of an ISMS, a management system similar in concept to those recommended by other ISO standards such as ISO 9000 and ISO 14000, used to manage information security risks and controls within an organization. Bringing information security deliberately under overt management control is a central principle throughout the ISO/IEC 27000 series of standards.

The target audience is users of the remaining ISO/IEC 27000-series information security management standards.

== Glossary ==
Information security, like many technical subjects, is evolving a complex web of terminology. Relatively few authors take the trouble to define precisely what they mean, an approach which is unacceptable in the standards arena as it potentially leads to confusion and devalues formal assessment and certification. As with ISO 9000 and ISO 14000, the base '000' standard is intended to address this.

== See also ==
- ISO/IEC 27001
- ISO/IEC 27002 (formerly ISO/IEC 17799)
- ISO/IEC JTC 1/SC 27 - IT Security techniques
