= ISO/IEC JTC 1/SC 27 =

ISO/IEC JTC 1/SC 27 Information security, cybersecurity and privacy protection is a standardization subcommittee of the Joint Technical Committee ISO/IEC JTC 1 of the International Organization for Standardization (ISO) and the International Electrotechnical Commission (IEC). ISO/IEC JTC 1/SC 27 develops International Standards, Technical Reports, and Technical Specifications within the field of information security. Standardization activity by this subcommittee includes general methods, management system requirements, techniques and guidelines to address information security, cybersecurity and privacy. Drafts of International Standards by ISO/IEC JTC 1 or any of its subcommittees are sent out to participating national standardization bodies for ballot, comments and contributions. Publication as an ISO/IEC International Standard requires approval by a minimum of 75% of the national bodies casting a vote. The international secretariat of ISO/IEC JTC 1/SC 27 is the Deutsches Institut für Normung (DIN) located in Germany.

== History ==
ISO/IEC JTC 1/SC 27 was founded by ISO/IEC JTC 1 in 1990. The subcommittee was formed when ISO/IEC JTC 1/SC 20, which covered standardization within the field of security techniques, covering "secret-key techniques" (ISO/IEC JTC 1/SC 20/WG 1), "public-key techniques" (ISO/IEC JTC 1/SC 20/WG 2), and "data encryption protocols" (ISO/IEC JTC 1/SC 20/WG 3) was disbanded. This allowed for ISO/IEC JTC 1/SC 27 to take over the work of ISO/IEC JTC 1/SC 20 (specifically that of its first two working groups) as well as to extend its scope to other areas within the field of IT security techniques. Since 1990, the subcommittee has extended or altered its scope and working groups to meet the current standardization demands. ISO/IEC JTC 1/SC 27, which started with three working groups, eventually expanded its structure to contain five. The two new working groups were added in April 2006, at the 17th Plenary Meeting in Madrid, Spain.

== Scope ==
The scope of ISO/IEC JTC 1/SC 27 is "The development of standards for the protection of information and ICT. This includes generic methods, techniques and guidelines to address both security and privacy aspects, such as:

- Security requirements capture methodology;
- Management of information and ICT security; in particular information security management systems, security processes, security controls and services;
- Cryptographic and other security mechanisms, including but not limited to mechanisms for protecting the accountability, availability, integrity and confidentiality of information;
- Security management support documentation including terminology, guidelines as well as procedures for the registration of security components;
- Security aspects of identity management, biometrics and privacy;
- Conformance assessment, accreditation and auditing requirements in the area of information security management systems;
- Security evaluation criteria and methodology.

SC 27 engages in active liaison and collaboration with appropriate bodies to ensure the proper development and application of SC 27 standards and technical reports in relevant areas."

== Structure ==
ISO/IEC JTC 1/SC 27 is made up of five working groups (WG), each of which is responsible for the technical development of information and IT security standards within the programme of work of ISO/IEC JTC 1/SC 27. In addition, ISO/IEC JTC 1/SC 27 has two special working groups (SWG): (i) SWG-M, which operates under the direction of ISO/IEC JTC 1/SC 27 with the primary task of reviewing and evaluating the organizational effectiveness of ISO/IEC JTC 1/SC 27 processes and mode of operations; and (ii) SWG-T, which operates under the direction of ISO/IEC JTC 1/SC 27 to address topics beyond the scope of the respective existing WGs or that can affect directly or indirectly multiple WGs. ISO/IEC JTC 1/SC 27 also has a Communications Officer whose role is to promote the work of ISO/IEC JTC 1/SC 27 through different channels: press releases and articles, conferences and workshops, interactive ISO chat forums and other media channels.

The focus of each working group is described in the group's terms of reference. Working groups of ISO/IEC JTC 1/SC 27 are:

Working Group	Working Area
ISO/IEC JTC 1/SC 27/SWG-M	Management
ISO/IEC JTC 1/SC 27/SWG-T	Transversal items
ISO/IEC JTC 1/SC 27/WG 1	Information security management systems
ISO/IEC JTC 1/SC 27/WG 2	Cryptography and security mechanisms
ISO/IEC JTC 1/SC 27/WG 3	Security evaluation, testing and specification
ISO/IEC JTC 1/SC 27/WG 4	Security controls and services
ISO/IEC JTC 1/SC 27/WG 5	Identity management and privacy technologies

== Collaborations ==
ISO/IEC JTC 1/SC 27 works in close collaboration with a number of other organizations or subcommittees, both internal and external to ISO or IEC, in order to avoid conflicting or duplicative work. Organizations internal to ISO or IEC that collaborate with or are in liaison to ISO/IEC JTC 1/SC 27 include:

- ISO/IEC JTC 1/SWG 6, Management
- ISO/IEC JTC 1/WG 7, Sensor networks
- ISO/IEC JTC 1/WG 9, Big Data
- ISO/IEC JTC 1/WG 10, Internet of Things (IoT)
- ISO/IEC JTC 1/SC 6, Telecommunications and information exchange between systems
- ISO/IEC JTC 1/SC 7, Software and systems engineering
- ISO/IEC JTC 1/SC 17, Cards and personal identification
- ISO/IEC JTC 1/SC 22, Programming languages, their environments and system software interfaces
- ISO/IEC JTC 1/SC 25, Interconnection of information technology equipment
- ISO/IEC JTC 1/SC 31, Automatic identification and data capture techniques
- ISO/IEC JTC 1/SC 36, Information technology for learning, education and training
- ISO/IEC JTC 1/SC 37, Biometrics
- ISO/IEC JTC 1/SC 38, Cloud computing and distributed platforms
- ISO/IEC JTC 1/SC 40, IT Service Management and IT Governance
- ISO/TC 8, Ships and marine technology
- ISO/TC 46, Information and documentation
- ISO/TC 46/SC 11, Archives/records management
- ISO/TC 68, Financial services
- ISO/TC 68/SC 2, Financial Services, security
- ISO/TC 68/SC 7, Core banking
- ISO/TC 171, Document management applications
- ISO/TC 176, Quality management and quality assurance
- ISO/TC 176/SC 3, Supporting technologies
- ISO/TC 204, Intelligent transport systems
- ISO/TC 215, Health informatics
- ISO/TC 251, Asset management
- ISO/TC 259, Outsourcing
- ISO/TC 262, Risk management
- ISO/TC 272, Forensic sciences
- ISO/TC 292, Security and resilience
- ISO/CASCO, Committee on Conformity Assessments
- ISO/TMB/JTCG, Joint technical Coordination Group on MSS
- ISO/TMB/SAG EE 1, Strategic Advisory Group on Energy Efficiency
- IEC/SC 45A, Instrumentation, control and electrical systems of nuclear facilities
- IEC/TC 57, Power systems management and associated information exchange
- IEC/TC 65, Industrial-process measurement, control and automation
- IEC Advisory Committee on Information security and data privacy (ACSEC)

Some organizations external to ISO or IEC that collaborate with or are in liaison to ISO/IEC JTC 1/SC 27 include:

- Attribute-based Credentials for Trust (ABC4Trust)
- Article 29 Data Protection Working Party
- Common Criteria Development Board (CCDB)
- Consortium of Digital Forensic Specialists (CDFS)
- CEN/TC 377
- CEN/PC 428 e-Competence and ICT professionalism
- Cloud Security Alliance (CSA)
- Cloud Standards Customer Council (CSCC)
- Common Study Center of Telediffusion and Telecommunication (CCETT)
- The Cyber Security Naming & Information Structure Groups (Cyber Security)
- Ecma International
- European Committee for Banking Standards (ECBS)
- European Network and Information Security Agency (ENISA)
- European Payments Council (EPC)
- European Telecommunications Standards Institute (ETSI)
- European Data Centre Association (EUDCA)
- Eurocloud
- Future of Identity in the Information Society (FIDIS)
- Forum of Incident Response and Security Teams (FIRST)
- Information Security Forum (ISF)
- Latinoamerican Institute for Quality Assurance (INLAC)
- Institute of Electrical and Electronics Engineers (IEEE)
- International Conference of Data Protection and Privacy Commissioners
- International Information Systems Security Certification Consortium ((ISC)2)
- International Smart Card Certification Initiatives (ISCI)
- The International Society of Automation (ISA)
- INTERPOL
- ISACA
- International Standardized Commercial Identifier (ISCI)
- Information Security Forum (ISF)
- ITU-T
- Kantara Initiative
- MasterCard
- PReparing Industry to Privacy-by-design by supporting its Application in REsearch (PRIPARE)
- Technology-supported Risk Estimation by Predictive Assessment of Socio-technical Security (TREsPASS)
- Privacy and Identity Management for Community Services (PICOS)
- Privacy-Preserving Computation in the Cloud (PRACTICE)
- The Open Group
- The OpenID Foundation (OIDF)
- TeleManagement Forum (TMForum)
- Trusted Computing Group (TCG)
- Visa

== Member countries ==
Countries pay a fee to ISO to be members of subcommittees.

The 51 "P" (participating) members of ISO/IEC JTC 1/SC 27 are: Algeria, Argentina, Australia, Austria, Belgium, Brazil, Canada, Chile, China, Cyprus, Czech Republic, Côte d'Ivoire, Denmark, Finland, France, Germany, India, Ireland, Israel, Italy, Jamaica, Japan, Kazakhstan, Kenya, Republic of Korea, Luxembourg, Malaysia, Mauritius, Mexico, Netherlands, New Zealand, Norway, Peru, Poland, Romania, Russian Federation, Rwanda, Singapore, Slovakia, South Africa, Spain, Sri Lanka, Sweden, Switzerland, Thailand, the Republic of Macedonia, Ukraine, United Arab Emirates, United Kingdom, United States of America, and Uruguay.

The 20 "O" (observing) members of ISO/IEC JTC 1/SC 27 are: Belarus, Bosnia and Herzegovina, Costa Rica, El Salvador, Estonia, Ghana, Hong Kong, Hungary, Iceland, Indonesia, Islamic Republic of Iran, Lithuania, Morocco, State of Palestine, Portugal, Saudi Arabia, Serbia, Slovenia, Swaziland, and Turkey.

As of August 2014, the spread of meeting locations since Spring 1990 has been as shown below:

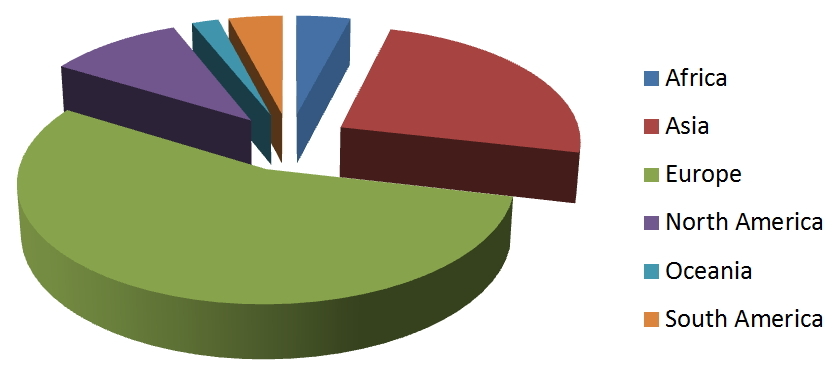
Meeting Locations

== Published standards ==
ISO/IEC JTC 1/SC 27 currently has 147 published standards within the field of IT security techniques, including:

ISO/IEC Standard	Title	Status	Description	WG
ISO/IEC 27000 free	Information technology – Security techniques – Information security management systems – Overview and vocabulary	Published (2018)	Describes the overview and vocabulary of ISMS	1
ISO/IEC 27001	Information technology – Security techniques – Information security management systems – Requirements	Published (2013)	Specifies the requirements for establishing, implementing, monitoring, and maintaining documented a documented ISMS within an organization. "Transition mapping" ISO/IEC 27023 provides a set of tables showing the correspondence between editions 1 and 2 of the standard	1
ISO/IEC 27002	Information technology – Security techniques – Code of practice for information security controls	Published (2013)	Provides guidelines for information security management practices for use by those selecting, implementing, or maintaining ISMS "Transition mapping" ISO/IEC 27023 provides a set of tables showing the correspondence between editions 1 and 2 of the standard	1
ISO/IEC 27006	Information technology -- Security techniques -- Requirements for bodies providing audit and certification of information security management systems	Published (2015)	Specifies general requirements for a third-party body operating ISMS (in accordance with ISO/IEC 27001:2005) certification/registration has to meet, if it is to be recognized as competent and reliable in the operation of ISMS certification / registration	1
ITU-T X.1051 / ISO/IEC 27011	Information technology -- Security techniques -- Information security management guidelines for telecommunications organizations based on ISO/IEC 27002	Published (2008)	This recommendation/international standard: a) establishes guidelines and general principles for initiating, implementing, maintaining, and improving information security management in telecommunications organizations based on ISO/IEC 27002; b) provides an implementation baseline of Information Security Management within telecommunications organizations to ensure the confidentiality, integrity and availability of telecommunications facilities and services	1
ISO/IEC 18033-1	Information technology – Security techniques – Encryption algorithms – Part 1: General	Published (2015)	Specifies encryption systems for the purpose of data confidentiality	2
ISO/IEC 19772	Information technology – Security techniques – Authenticated encryption	Published (2009)	Specifies six methods for authenticated encryption with the security objectives of: Data confidentiality; Data integrity; Data origin authentication	2
ISO/IEC 15408-1 free	Information technology – Security techniques – Evaluation criteria for IT security – Part 1: Introduction and general model	Published (2009, corrected and reprinted 2014)	Establishes the general concepts and principles of IT security evaluation, and specifies the general model of evaluation given by various other parts of ISO/IEC 15408.	3
ISO/IEC 19792	Information technology – Security techniques – Security evaluation of biometrics	Published (2009)	Specifies the subjects to be addressed during the security evaluation of a biometric system	3
ISO/IEC 27031	Information technology – Security techniques – Guidelines for information and communication technology readiness for business continuity	Published (2011)	Describes the concepts and principles of ICT readiness for business continuity and the method and framework needed to identify aspects in which to improve it.	4
ISO/IEC 27034-1	Information technology – Security techniques – Application security – Part 1: Overview and concepts	Published (2011)	Addresses the management needs for ensuring the security of applications and presents an overview of application security through the introduction of definitions, concepts, principles and processes	4
ISO/IEC 27035	Information technology -- Security techniques -- Information security incident management	Published (2011)	Provides a structured and planned approach to: Detect, report, and assess information security incidents; Respond to and manage information security incidents; Detect, assess, and manage information security vulnerabilities	4
ISO/IEC 27037	Information technology – Security techniques – Guidelines for identification, collection, acquisition and preservation of digital evidence	Published (2012)	Provides guidance for the handling of digital evidence that could be of evidential value	4
ISO/IEC 24760-1 free	Information technology – Security techniques – A framework for identity management – Part 1: Terminology and concepts	Published (2011)	Provides a framework for the secure and reliable management of identities by: Defining the terms for identity management; Specifying the core concepts of identity and identity management	5
ISO/IEC 24760-2	Information technology - Security techniques - A framework for identity management - Part 2: Reference architecture and requirements	Published (2015)	Provides guidelines for the implementation of systems for the management of identity information and specifies requirements for the implementation and operation of a framework for identity management.	5
ISO/IEC 24761	Information technology – Security techniques – Authentication context for biometrics	Published (2009)	Specifies the structure and data elements of Authentication Context for Biometrics (ACBio), which checks the validity of biometric verification process results	5
ISO/IEC 29100 free	Information technology – Security techniques – Privacy framework	Published (2011)	Provides a privacy framework that: Specifies a common privacy terminology; Describes privacy safeguarding considerations; Provides references to known privacy principles for IT	5
ISO/IEC 29101	Information technology – Security techniques – Privacy architecture framework	Published (2013)	Defines a privacy architecture framework that: Specifies concerns for ICT systems that process PII; Lists components for the implementation of such systems; Provides architectural views contextualizing these components; Applicable to entities involved in specifying, procuring, designing, testing, maintaining, administering and operating ICT systems that process PII. Focuses primarily on ICT systems that are designed to interact with PII principals.	5

== See also ==
- ISO/IEC JTC 1
- List of ISO standards
- Deutsches Institut für Normung
- International Organization for Standardization
- International Electrotechnical Commission
