= List of ISO standards 30000–99999 =

This is a list of published (Note: This list generally excludes draft versions.) International Organization for Standardization (ISO) standards and other deliverables. (Note: ISO deliverables include "specifications" (ISO/PAS, ISO/TS), "reports" (ISO/TR), etc, which are not referred to by ISO as "standards".) For a complete and up-to-date list of all the ISO standards, see the ISO catalogue.

The standards are protected by copyright and most of them must be purchased. However, about 300 of the standards produced by ISO and IEC's Joint Technical Committee 1 (JTC 1) have been made freely and publicly available.

== ISO 30000 – ISO 39999 ==
- ISO 30000:2009 Ships and marine technology – Ship recycling management systems – Specifications for management systems for safe and environmentally sound ship recycling facilities
- ISO 30002:2012 Ships and marine technology – Ship recycling management systems – Guidelines for selection of ship recyclers (and pro forma contract)
- ISO 30003:2009 Ships and marine technology – Ship recycling management systems – Requirements for bodies providing audit and certification of ship recycling management
- ISO 30004:2012 Ships and marine technology – Ship recycling management systems – Guidelines for the implementation of ISO 30000
- ISO 30005:2012 Ships and marine technology – Ship recycling management systems – Information control for hazardous materials in the manufacturing chain of shipbuilding and ship operations
- ISO 30006:2010 Ship recycling management systems – Diagrams to show the location of hazardous materials on board ships
- ISO 30007:2010 Ships and marine technology – Measures to prevent asbestos emission and exposure during ship recycling
- ISO 30042:2019 Management of terminology resources — TermBase eXchange (TBX)
- ISO/IEC 30071 Information technology — Development of user interface accessibility
  - ISO/IEC 30071-1:2019 Part 1: Code of practice for creating accessible ICT products and services
- ISO/IEC 30100 Information technology – Home network resource management
  - ISO/IEC 30100-1:2016 Part 1: Requirements
  - ISO/IEC 30100-2:2016 Part 2: Architecture
  - ISO/IEC 30100-3:2016 Part 3: Management application
- ISO/IEC 30101:2014 Information technology – Sensor networks: Sensor network and its interfaces for smart grid system
- ISO/IEC TR 30102:2012 Information technology – Distributed Application Platforms and Services (DAPS) – General technical principles of Service Oriented Architecture
- ISO/IEC TS 30103:2015 Software and Systems Engineering – Lifecycle Processes – Framework for Product Quality Achievement
- ISO/IEC TS 30104:2015 Information Technology – Security Techniques – Physical Security Attacks, Mitigation Techniques and Security Requirements
- ISO/IEC 30105 Information technology – IT Enabled Services-Business Process Outsourcing (ITES-BPO) lifecycle processes
  - ISO/IEC 30105-1:2016 Part 1: Process reference model (PRM)
  - ISO/IEC 30105-2:2016 Part 2: Process assessment model (PAM)
  - ISO/IEC 30105-3:2016 Part 3: Measurement framework (MF) and organization maturity model (OMM)
  - ISO/IEC 30105-4:2016 Part 4: Terms and concepts
  - ISO/IEC 30105-5:2016 Part 5: Guidelines
- ISO/IEC 30106 Information technology – Object oriented BioAPI
  - ISO/IEC 30106-1:2016 Part 1: Architecture
  - ISO/IEC 30106-2:2016 Part 2: Java implementation
  - ISO/IEC 30106-3:2016 Part 3: C# implementation
- ISO/IEC 30107 Information technology – Biometric presentation attack detection
  - ISO/IEC 30107-1:2016 Part 1: Framework
  - ISO/IEC 30107-3:2017 Part 3: Testing and reporting
- ISO/IEC 30108 Information technology – Biometric Identity Assurance Services
  - ISO/IEC 30108-1:2015 Part 1: BIAS services
- ISO/IEC TR 30109:2015 Information technology – User interfaces – Worldwide availability of personalized computer environments
- ISO/IEC TR 30110:2015 Information technology – Cross jurisdictional and societal aspects of implementation of biometric technologies – Biometrics and children
- ISO/IEC 30111:2013 Information technology – Security techniques – Vulnerability handling processes
- ISO/IEC TR 30112:2014 Information technology – Specification methods for cultural conventions
- ISO/IEC 30113 Information technology – Gesture-based interfaces across devices and methods (Note: The exact wording of this title varies between parts. This is the wording of the most recently published part.)
  - ISO/IEC 30113-1:2015 Part 1: Framework
  - ISO/IEC 30113-11:2017 Part 11: Single-point gestures for common system
- ISO/IEC TR 30114 Information technology – Extensions of Office Open XML file formats
  - ISO/IEC TR 30114-1:2016 Part 1: Guidelines
  - ISO/IEC 30114-2:2018 Part 2: Character repertoire checking
- ISO/IEC 30116:2016 Information technology – Automatic identification and data capture techniques – Optical Character Recognition (OCR) quality testing
- ISO/IEC TR 30117:2014 Information technology – Guide to on-card biometric comparison standards and applications
- ISO/IEC 30121:2015 Information technology – Governance of digital forensic risk framework
- ISO/IEC 30122 Information technology – User interfaces – Voice commands
  - ISO/IEC 30122-1:2016 Part 1: Framework and general guidance
  - ISO/IEC 30122-2:2017 Part 2: Constructing and testing
  - ISO/IEC 30122-3:2017 Part 3: Translation and localization
  - ISO/IEC 30122-4:2016 Part 4: Management of voice command registration
- ISO/IEC TR 30125:2016 Information technology – Biometrics used with mobile devices
- ISO/IEC 30128:2014 Information technology – Sensor networks – Generic Sensor Network Application Interface
- ISO/IEC 30129:2015 Information technology – Telecommunications bonding networks for buildings and other structures
- ISO/IEC 30130:2016 Software engineering – Capabilities of software testing tools
- ISO/IEC TR 30132 Information technology – Information technology sustainability – Energy efficient computing models
  - ISO/IEC TR 30132-1:2016 Part 1: Guidelines for energy effectiveness evaluation
- ISO/IEC 30134 Information technology – Data centres – Key performance indicators
  - ISO/IEC 30134-1:2016 Part 1: Overview and general requirements
  - ISO/IEC 30134-2:2016 Part 2: Power usage effectiveness (PUE)
  - ISO/IEC 30134-3:2016 Part 3: Renewable energy factor (REF)
- ISO/IEC TS 30135 Information technology – Digital publishing – EPUB3
  - ISO/IEC TS 30135-1:2014 Part 1: EPUB3 Overview
  - ISO/IEC TS 30135-2:2014 Part 2: Publications
  - ISO/IEC TS 30135-3:2014 Part 3: Content Documents
  - ISO/IEC TS 30135-4:2014 Part 4: Open Container Format
  - ISO/IEC TS 30135-5:2014 Part 5: Media Overlay
  - ISO/IEC TS 30135-6:2014 Part 6: EPUB Canonical Fragment Identifier
  - ISO/IEC TS 30135-7:2014 Part 7: EPUB3 Fixed-Layout Documents
- ISO/IEC 30170:2012 Information technology – Programming languages – Ruby
- ISO/IEC 30182:2017 Smart city concept model – Guidance for establishing a model for data interoperability
- ISO/IEC 30190:2016 Information technology – Digitally recorded media for information interchange and storage – 120 mm Single Layer (25,0 Gbytes per disk) and Dual Layer (50,0 Gbytes per disk) BD Recordable disk
- ISO/IEC 30191:2015 Information technology – Digitally recorded media for information interchange and storage – 120 mm Triple Layer (100,0 Gbytes single sided disk and 200,0 Gbytes double sided disk) and Quadruple Layer (128,0 Gbytes single sided disk) BD Recordable disk
- ISO/IEC 30192:2016 Information technology – Digitally recorded media for information interchange and storage – 120 mm Single Layer (25,0 Gbytes per disk) and Dual Layer (50,0 Gbytes per disk) BD Rewritable disk
- ISO/IEC 30193:2016 Information technology – Digitally recorded media for information interchange and storage – 120 mm Triple Layer (100,0 Gbytes per disk) BD Rewritable disk
- ISO 30300:2020 Information and documentation – Management systems for records – Fundamentals and vocabulary
- ISO 30301:2019 Information and documentation – Management systems for records – Requirements
- ISO 30302:2022 Information and documentation – Management systems for records – Guidelines for implementation
- ISO 30400:2016 Human resource management – Vocabulary
- ISO 30401:2018 Knowledge management system - Requirements
- ISO 30405:2016 Human resource management – Guidelines on recruitment
- ISO/TR 30406:2017 Human resource management – Sustainable employability management for organizations
- ISO/TS 30407:2017 Human resource management – Cost-Per-Hire
- ISO 30408:2016 Human resource management – Guidelines on human governance
- ISO 30409:2016 Human resource management – Workforce planning
- ISO 30414:2018 Human resource management – Guidelines for internal and external human capital reporting
- ISO 30415:2021 Human resource management — Diversity and inclusion
- ISO 30500:2018 Non-sewered sanitation systems — Prefabricated integrated treatment units — General safety and performance requirements for design and testing
- ISO 31000:2018 Risk management – Principles and guidelines
- ISO/TR 31004:2013 Risk management – Guidance for the implementation of ISO 31000
- ISO/IEC 31010:2009 Risk management – Risk assessment techniques
- ISO 31030:2021 Travel risk management — Guidance for organizations
- ISO/IEC/IEEE 31320 Information technology – Modeling Languages
  - ISO/IEC/IEEE 31320-1:2012 Part 1: Syntax and Semantics for IDEF0
  - ISO/IEC/IEEE 31320-2:2012 Part 2: Syntax and Semantics for IDEF1X97 (IDEFobject)
- ISO 32000 Document management – Portable document format
- ISO/IEC 33001:2015 Information technology – Process assessment – Concepts and terminology
- ISO/IEC 33002:2015 Information technology – Process assessment – Requirements for performing process assessment
- ISO/IEC 33003:2015 Information technology – Process assessment – Requirements for process measurement frameworks
- ISO/IEC 33004:2015 Information technology – Process assessment – Requirements for process reference, process assessment and maturity models
- ISO/IEC TR 33014:2013 Information technology – Process assessment – Guide for process improvement
- ISO/IEC 33020:2015 Information technology – Process assessment – Process measurement framework for assessment of process capability
- ISO/IEC TS 33030:2017 Information technology – Process assessment – An exemplar documented assessment process
- ISO/IEC TS 33052:2016 Information technology – Process reference model (PRM) for information security management
- ISO/IEC 33063:2015 Information technology – Process assessment – Process assessment model for software testing
- ISO/IEC 33071:2016 Information technology – Process assessment – An integrated process capability assessment model for Enterprise processes
- ISO/IEC TS 33072:2016 Information technology – Process assessment – Process capability assessment model for information security management
- ISO 35001:2019 Biorisk management for laboratories and other related organisations
- ISO 37000:2021 Governance of organizations — Guidance
- ISO 37001:2016 Anti-bribery management systems
- ISO 37120 Sustainable development of communities – Indicators for city services and quality of life
- ISO/TR 37137:2014 Cardiovascular biological evaluation of medical devices – Guidance for absorbable implants
- ISO 37500:2014 Guidance on outsourcing
- ISO/IEC 38500:2015 Information technology – Governance of IT for the organization
- ISO/IEC TS 38501:2015 Information technology – Governance of IT – Implementation guide
- ISO/IEC TR 38502:2014 Information technology – Governance of IT – Framework and model
- ISO/IEC TR 38504:2016 Governance of information technology – Guidance for principles-based standards in the governance of information technology
- ISO/IEC 38505 Information technology – Governance of IT – Governance of data
  - ISO/IEC 38505-1:2017 Part 1: Application of ISO/IEC 38500 to the governance of data
- ISO 39001:2012 Road traffic safety (RTS) management systems – Requirements with guidance for use

== ISO 40000 – ISO 49999 ==
- ISO/IEC 40180:2017 Information technology – Quality for learning, education and training – Fundamentals and reference framework
- ISO/IEC 40210:2011 Information technology – W3C SOAP Version 1.2 Part 1: Messaging Framework (Second Edition)
- ISO/IEC 40220:2011 Information technology – W3C SOAP Version 1.2 Part 2: Adjuncts (Second Edition)
- ISO/IEC 40230:2011 Information technology – W3C SOAP Message Transmission Optimization Mechanism
- ISO/IEC 40240:2011 Information technology – W3C Web Services Addressing 1.0 – Core
- ISO/IEC 40250:2011 Information technology – W3C Web Services Addressing 1.0 – SOAP Binding
- ISO/IEC 40260:2011 Information technology – W3C Web Services Addressing 1.0 – Metadata
- ISO/IEC 40270:2011 Information technology – W3C Web Services Policy 1.5 – Framework
- ISO/IEC 40280:2011 Information technology – W3C Web Services Policy 1.5 – Attachment
- ISO/IEC 40314:2016 Information technology – Mathematical Markup Language (MathML) Version 3.0 2nd Edition
- ISO/IEC 40500:2012 Information technology – W3C Web Content Accessibility Guidelines (WCAG) 2.0
- ISO 41011:2024 Facility management – Vocabulary
- ISO 41012:2017 Facility management – Guidance on strategic sourcing and the development of agreements
- ISO/TR 41013:2017 Facility management – Scope, key concepts and benefits
- ISO/IEC 42001:2023 Information technology — Artificial intelligence — Management system
- ISO/IEC 42005:2025 Information technology — Artificial intelligence (AI) — AI system impact assessment
- ISO/IEC 42006:2025 Information technology — Artificial intelligence — Requirements for bodies providing audit and certification of artificial intelligence management systems
- ISO/IEC 42010:2011 Systems and software engineering – Architecture description
- ISO 42500:2021 Sharing economy - General principles
- ISO/TS 42501:2022 Sharing economy — General trustworthiness and safety requirements for digital platforms
- ISO/TS 42502:2022 Sharing economy — Guidance for provider verification on digital platforms
- ISO/TS 42507:2025 Sharing economy — Use cases of sharing economy platforms in the public sector
- ISO 44001:2017 Collaborative business relationship management systems — Requirements and framework
- ISO 45001 Occupational health and safety management systems – Requirements with guidance for use

framework

- ISO 45003 Psychological health and safety at work
- ISO 46001:2019 Water efficiency management systems - Requirements with guidance for use

== ISO 50000 – ISO 59999 ==
- ISO 50001:2018 Energy management systems – Requirements with guidance for use
- ISO 50002:2014 Energy audits – Requirements with guidance for use
- ISO 50003:2014 Energy management systems – Requirements for bodies providing audit and certification of energy management systems
- ISO 50004:2014 Energy management systems – Guidance for the implementation, maintenance and improvement of an energy management system
- ISO 50006:2014 Energy management systems – Measuring energy performance using energy baselines (EnB) and energy performance indicators (EnPI) – General principles and guidance
- ISO 50007:2017 Energy services – Guidelines for assessment and improvement of the energy service to users
- ISO 50015:2014 Energy management systems – Measurement and verification of energy performance of organizations—General principles and guidance
- ISO/TS 50044:2019 Energy saving projects (EnSPs) – Guideline for economic and financial evaluation
- ISO 50046:2019 General methods for predicting energy savings
- ISO 50047:2016 Energy savings – Determination of energy savings in organizations
- ISO/ASTM 51026:2015 Practice for using the Fricke dosimetry system
- ISO/ASTM 51205:2017 Practice for use of a ceric-cerous sulfate dosimetry system
- ISO/ASTM 51261:2013 Practice for calibration of routine dosimetry systems for radiation processing
- ISO/ASTM 51275:2013 Practice for use of a radiochromic film dosimetry system
- ISO/ASTM 51276:2012 Practice for use of a polymethylmethacrylate dosimetry system
- ISO/ASTM 51310:2004 Practice for use of a radiochromic optical waveguide dosimetry system
- ISO/ASTM 51401:2013 Practice for use of a dichromate dosimetry system
- ISO/ASTM 51431:2005 Practice for dosimetry in electron beam and X-ray (bremsstrahlung) irradiation facilities for food processing
- ISO/ASTM 51538:2009 Practice for use of the ethanol-chlorobenzene dosimetry system
- ISO/ASTM 51539:2013 Guide for use of radiation-sensitive indicators
- ISO/ASTM 51540:2004 Practice for use of a radiochromic liquid dosimetry system
- ISO/ASTM 51607:2013 Practice for use of the alanine-EPR dosimetry system
- ISO/ASTM 51608:2015 Practice for dosimetry in an X-ray (bremsstrahlung) facility for radiation processing at energies between 50 keV and 7.5 MeV
- ISO/ASTM 51631:2013 Practice for use of calorimetric dosimetry systems for electron beam dose measurements and dosimetry system calibrations
- ISO/ASTM 51649:2015 Practice for dosimetry in an electron beam facility for radiation processing at energies between 300 keV and 25 MeV
- ISO/ASTM 51650:2013 Practice for use of a cellulose triacetate dosimetry system
- ISO/ASTM 51702:2013 Practice for dosimetry in a gamma facility for radiation processing
- ISO/ASTM 51707:2015 Guide for estimation of measurement uncertainty in dosimetry for radiation processing
- ISO/ASTM 51818:2013 Practice for dosimetry in an electron beam facility for radiation processing at energies between 80 and 300 keV
- ISO/ASTM 51900:2009 Guide for dosimetry in radiation research on food and agricultural products
- ISO/ASTM 51939:2017 Practice for blood irradiation dosimetry
- ISO/ASTM 51940:2013 Guide for dosimetry for sterile insects release programs
- ISO/ASTM 51956:2013 Practice for use of a thermoluminescence-dosimetry system (TLD system) for radiation processing
- ISO/ASTM 52116:2013 Practice for dosimetry for a self-contained dry-storage gamma irradiator
- ISO/ASTM 52303:2015 Guide for absorbed-dose mapping in radiation processing facilities
- ISO/ASTM 52628:2013 Standard practice for dosimetry in radiation processing
- ISO/ASTM 52701:2013 Guide for performance characterization of dosimeters and dosimetry systems for use in radiation processing
- ISO/ASTM 52900:2015 Additive manufacturing – General principles – Terminology
- ISO/ASTM 52915:2016 Specification for additive manufacturing file format (AMF) Version 1.2
- ISO 53800:2024 Guidelines for the promotion and implementation of gender equality and women’s empowerment
- ISO 55000:2014 Asset management – Overview, principles and terminology
- ISO 55001:2014 Asset management – Management systems – Requirements
- ISO 55002:2014 Asset management – Management systems – Guidelines for the application of ISO 55001
- ISO 56000:2020 Innovation management — Fundamentals and vocabulary
- ISO 56002:2019 Innovation management — Innovation management system — Guidance
- ISO 56003:2019 Innovation management - Tools and methods for innovation partnership - Guidance
- ISO/TR 56004:2019 Innovation Management Assessment — Guidance
- ISO 56005:2020 Innovation management — Tools and methods for intellectual property management — Guidance

== ISO 60000 – ISO 69999 ==
The 60000 series is reserved for IEC-lead standards.

- ISO/IEC 60559:2020 Information technology — Microprocessor Systems — Floating-Point arithmetic

== ISO 80000 – ISO 89999 ==
The 80000 series is reserved for multi-part standards jointly developed by ISO and IEC, in which some parts are published by ISO and others by IEC.

- ISO/IEC 80000 Quantities and units
- ISO/IEC 80001 Application of risk management for IT-networks incorporating medical devices
  - IEC 80001-1:2010 Part 1: Roles, responsibilities and activities
  - IEC/TR 80001-2-1:2012 Part 2-1: Step by Step Risk Management of Medical IT-Networks; Practical Applications and Examples
  - IEC/TR 80001-2-2:2012 Part 2-2: Guidance for the communication of medical device security needs, risks and controls
  - IEC/TR 80001-2-3:2012 Part 2-3: Guidance for wireless networks
  - IEC/TR 80001-2-4:2012 Part 2-4: General implementation guidance for Healthcare Delivery Organizations
  - IEC/TR 80001-2-5:2014 Part 2-5: Application guidance – Guidance for distributed alarm systems
  - ISO/TR 80001-2-6:2014 Part 2-6: Application guidance – Guidance for responsibility agreements
  - ISO/TR 80001-2-7:2015 Part 2-7: Guidance for healthcare delivery organizations (HDOs) on how to self-assess their conformance with IEC 80001-1
  - IEC/TR 80001-2-8:2016 Part 2-8: Application guidance – Guidance on standards for establishing the security capabilities identified in IEC 80001-2-2
  - IEC/TR 80001-2-9:2017 Part 2-9: Application guidance – Guidance for use of security assurance cases to demonstrate confidence in IEC/TR 80001-2-2 security capabilities
- IEC/TR 80002 Medical device software
  - IEC/TR 80002-1:2009 Part 1: Guidance on the application of ISO 14971 to medical device software
  - ISO/TR 80002-2:2017 Part 2: Validation of software for medical device quality systems
  - IEC/TR 80002-3:2014 Part 3: Process reference model of medical device software life cycle processes (IEC 62304)
- ISO/TS 80004 Nanotechnologies – Vocabulary
- ISO/IEC 80079 Explosive atmospheres
  - ISO/IEC 80079-20-1:2017 Part 20-1: Material characteristics for gas and vapour classification — Test methods and data
  - ISO/IEC 80079-20-2:2016 Part 20-2: Material characteristics — Combustible dusts test methods
  - ISO/IEC 80079-34:2018 Part 34: Application of quality management systems for Ex Product manufacture
  - ISO 80079-36:2016 Part 36: Non-electrical equipment for explosive atmospheres — Basic method and requirements
  - ISO 80079-37:2016 Part 37: Non-electrical equipment for explosive atmospheres — Non-electrical type of protection constructional safety ''c'', control of ignition sources ''b'', liquid immersion ''k''
  - ISO/IEC 80079-38:2016 Part 38: Equipment and components in explosive atmospheres in underground mines
- ISO/IEC 80369 Small-bore connectors for liquids and gases in healthcare applications
  - ISO 80369-1:2010 Part 1: General requirements
  - ISO 80369-3:2016 Part 3: Connectors for enteral applications
  - IEC 80369-5:2016 Part 5: Connectors for limb cuff inflation applications
  - ISO 80369-6:2016 Part 6: Connectors for neuraxial applications
  - ISO 80369-7:2016 Part 7: Connectors for intravascular or hypodermic applications
  - ISO 80369-20:2015 Part 20: Common test methods
- ISO/IEC 80416 Basic principles for graphical symbols for use on equipment
  - IEC 80416-1:2008 Part 1: Creation of graphical symbols for registration
  - ISO 80416-2:2001 Part 2: Form and use of arrows
  - IEC 80416-3:2002 Part 3: Guidelines for the application of graphical symbols
  - ISO 80416-4:2005 Part 4: Guidelines for the adaptation of graphical symbols for use on screens and displays (icons)
- ISO/IEC 80601 Medical electrical equipment
  - ISO 80601-2-12:2011 Part 2-12: Particular requirements for basic safety and essential performance of critical care ventilators
  - ISO 80601-2-13:2011 Part 2-13: Particular requirements for basic safety and essential performance of an anaesthetic workstation
  - IEC/ISO 80601-2-26 Part 2-26: Particular requirements for basic safety and essential performance of electroencephalographs
  - IEC 80601-2-30:2009 Part 2-30: Particular requirements for basic safety and essential performance of automated non-invasive sphygmomanometers
  - IEC/ISO 80601-2-49 Part 2-49: Particular requirements for the basic safety and essential performance of multifunction patient monitoring equipment
  - ISO 80601-2-55:2011 Part 2-55: Particular requirements for the basic safety and essential performance of respiratory gas monitors
  - ISO 80601-2-56:2017 Part 2-56: Particular requirements for basic safety and essential performance of clinical thermometers for body temperature measurement
  - IEC 80601-2-58:2014 Part 2-58: Particular requirements for basic safety and essential performance of lens removal devices and vitrectomy devices for ophthalmic surgery
  - IEC 80601-2-59:2017 Part 2-59: Particular requirements for the basic safety and essential performance of screening thermographs for human febrile temperature screening
  - IEC 80601-2-60:2012 Part 2-60: Particular requirements for basic safety and essential performance of dental equipment
  - ISO 80601-2-61:2017 Part 2-61: Particular requirements for basic safety and essential performance of pulse oximeter equipment
  - ISO 80601-2-67:2014 Part 2-67: Particular requirements for basic safety and essential performance of oxygen-conserving equipment
  - ISO 80601-2-69:2014 Part 2-69: Particular requirements for basic safety and essential performance of oxygen concentrator equipment
  - ISO 80601-2-70:2015 Part 2-70: Particular requirements for basic safety and essential performance of sleep apnoea breathing therapy equipment
  - IEC 80601-2-71:2015 Part 2-71: Particular requirements for the basic safety and essential performance of functional Near-Infrared Spectroscopy (NIRS) equipment
  - ISO 80601-2-72:2015 Part 2-72: Particular requirements for basic safety and essential performance of home healthcare environment ventilators for ventilator-dependent patients
  - ISO 80601-2-74:2017 Part 2-74: Particular requirements for basic safety and essential performance of respiratory humidifying equipment
  - IEC/ISO 80601-2-77 Part 2-77: Particular requirements for the basic safety and essential performance of robotically assisted surgical equipment
  - IEC/ISO 80601-2-78: Particular requirements for basic safety and essential performance of medical robots for rehabilitation, assessment, compensation or alleviation
  - ISO 80601-2-79: Home Health Ventilatory Support Equipment for Respiratory Impairment
  - ISO 80601-2-80: Home Health Ventilatory Support Equipment for Respiratory Insufficiency
  - ISO 80601-2-84: Emergency and transport ventilators
  - ISO 80601-2-85: Cerebral tissue oximeter equipment
  - ISO/IEC 80601-2-86 (under development): Particular requirements for the basic safety and essential performance of electrocardiographs, including diagnostic equipment, monitoring equipment, ambulatory equipment, electrodes, cables and leadwires
  - ISO 80601-2-87: High frequency critical care ventilators
  - ISO 80601-2-90: Ventilatory High-Flow Therapy Equipment
- ISO 81060 Non-invasive sphygmomanometers
  - ISO 81060-1:2007 Part 1: Requirements and test methods for non-automated measurement type
  - ISO 81060-2:2018 Part 2: Clinical investigation of intermittent automated measurement type
- ISO/IEC 81346 Industrial systems, installations and equipment and industrial products – Structuring principles and reference designations
  - IEC 81346-1:2009 Part 1: Basic rules
  - IEC 81346-2:2009 Part 2: Classification of objects and codes for classes
  - ISO/TS 81346-3:2012 Part 3: Application rules for a reference designation system
  - ISO/TS 81346-10:2015 Part 10: Power plants
- ISO/IEC 81714 Design of graphical symbols for use in the technical documentation of products
  - ISO 81714-1:2010 Part 1: Basic rules
  - IEC 81714-2:2006 Part 2: Specification for graphical symbols in a computer sensible form, including graphical symbols for a reference library, and requirements for their interchange
  - IEC 81714-3:2004 Part 3: Classification of connect nodes, networks and their encoding

== ISO 90000 – ISO 99999 ==
- ISO/IEC/IEEE 90003:2018 Software engineering — Guidelines for the application of ISO 9001:2015 to computer software
- ISO/IEC TR 90005:2008 Systems engineering — Guidelines for the application of ISO 9001 to system life cycle processes [Withdrawn without replacement]
- ISO/IEC TR 90006:2013 Information technology — Guidelines for the application of ISO 9001:2008 to IT service management and its integration with ISO/IEC 20000-1:2011 [Withdrawn without replacement]
