= Smart city (disambiguation) =

Smart city is a city using integrated information and communication technology.

It may also refer to:

- Smart City (film), a 2006 film
- Smart City Project, an urban planning initiative in Ethiopia

== See also ==
- List of smart cities
