= COBIT =

IT management framework by ISACA

COBIT (Control Objectives for Information and Related Technologies) is a framework created by ISACA for information technology (IT) management and IT governance.

The framework is business focused and defines a set of generic processes for the management of IT, with each process defined together with process inputs and outputs, key process-activities, process objectives, performance measures and an elementary maturity model.

== Framework and components ==
Business and IT goals are linked and measured to create responsibilities of business and IT teams.

Five processes are identified:

1. Evaluate, Direct and Monitor (EDM)
2. Align, Plan and Organize (APO)
3. Build, Acquire and Implement (BAI)
4. Deliver, Service and Support (DSS)
5. Monitor, Evaluate and Assess (MEA)

The COBIT framework ties in with COSO, ITIL, BiSL, ISO 27000, CMMI, TOGAF and PMBOK.

The framework helps companies follow law, be more agile and earn more.

Below are COBIT components:

- Framework: Organizes IT governance objectives and good practices by IT domains and processes and links them to business requirements.
- Process descriptions: A reference process model and common language for everyone in an organization. The processes map to responsibility areas of plan, build, run, and monitor.
- Control objectives: Provides a complete set of high-level requirements to be considered by management for effective control of each IT process.
- Management guidelines: Helps assign responsibility, agree on objectives, measure performance, and illustrate interrelationship with other processes.
- Maturity models: Assesses maturity and capability per process and helps to address gaps.

The standard meets all the needs of the practice, while maintaining independence from specific manufacturers, technologies and platforms. When developing the standard, it was possible to use it both for auditing a company's IT system and for designing an IT system. In the first case, COBIT allows you to determine the degree of conformity of the system under study to the best examples, and in the second, to design a system that is almost ideal in its characteristics.

=== Information criteria ===
The information criteria are a core component of the COBIT framework that describes the intent of the objectives. The specifics are the control of:

Effectiveness deals with information being relevant and pertinent to the business process as well as being delivered in a timely, correct, consistent and usable manner.

Efficiency concerns the provision of information through the optimal (most productive and economical) use of resources.

Confidentiality concerns the protection of sensitive information from unauthorised disclosure.

Integrity relates to the accuracy and completeness of information as well as to its validity in accordance with business values and expectations.

Availability relates to information being available when required by the business process now and in the future. It also concerns the safeguarding of necessary resources and associated capabilities.

Compliance deals with complying with the laws, regulations and contractual arrangements to which the business process is subject, i.e., externally imposed business criteria as well as internal policies.

Reliability relates to the provision of appropriate information for management to operate the entity and exercise its fiduciary and governance responsibilities.

== History ==
COBIT was initially "Control Objectives for Information and Related Technologies," though before the release of the framework people talked of "CobiT" as "Control Objectives for IT" or "Control Objectives for Information and Related Technology."

ISACA first released COBIT in 1996, originally as a set of control objectives to help the financial audit community better maneuver in IT-related environments. Seeing value in expanding the framework beyond just the auditing realm, ISACA released a broader version 2 in 1998 and expanded it even further by adding management guidelines in 2000's version 3. The development of both the AS 8015: Australian Standard for Corporate Governance of Information and Communication Technology in January 2005 and the more international draft standard ISO/IEC DIS 29382 (which soon after became ISO/IEC 38500) in January 2007 increased awareness of the need for more information and communication technology (ICT) governance components. ISACA inevitably added related components/frameworks with versions 4 and 4.1 in 2005 and 2007 respectively, "addressing the IT-related business processes and responsibilities in value creation (Val IT) and risk management (Risk IT)."

COBIT 5 (2012) is based on COBIT 4.1, Val IT 2.0 and Risk IT frameworks, and draws on ISACA's IT Assurance Framework (ITAF) and the Business Model for Information Security (BMIS).

ISACA currently offers certification tracks on both COBIT 2019 (COBIT Foundations, COBIT Design & Implementation, and Implementing the NIST Cybersecurity Framework Using COBIT 2019) as well as certification in the previous version (COBIT 5).

== See also ==
- IT governance
- Data governance
- Information assurance
- Information quality management
- ITIL
- ISO/IEC 38500
