= VMM =

VMM may refer to:

== Computing ==
- Virtual memory manager
- The Windows 9x Virtual Machine Manager (see VMM32)
- Virtual machine monitor, a hypervisor
- VAX VMM, an unreleased hypervisor for Digital's VAX hardware
- The RedHat Virtual Machine Manager
- Verification Methodology Manual (see Reference Verification Methodology)
- vmm: a native hypervisor on OpenBSD
- The .vmm file type, used for 3D movies

== Other ==
- Value measuring methodology in Project Management and Governance
- Veitch Memorial Medal for contributions to horticulture
- Vodafone McLaren Mercedes, a motor racing team based England best known as a Formula One constructor
- Vlaamse Media Maatschappij, a Belgian commercial radio and television provider
- Virginia Mennonite Missions
- common abbreviation for the Middle Magdalena Valley in Colombia
