= List of smart cities =

The following is a list of cities that have implemented smart city initiatives, organized by continent and then alphabetically.

The Institute for Management Development and Singapore University of Technology and Design rank cities in the Smart City Index based on technological, economic, and human criteria (e.g., quality of life, the environment, and inclusiveness). In the Smart City Index 2023, the top 15 smart cities were, in order, Zürich, Oslo, Canberra, Copenhagen, Lausanne, London, Singapore, Helsinki, Geneva, Stockholm, Hamburg, Beijing, Abu Dhabi, Prague, and Amsterdam. Since the index's first publication in 2019, Zürich and Oslo have consistently ranked first and second.

== Africa ==
- The New Capital, Egypt

== Asia ==
=== Dubai, UAE ===
In 2013, the Smart Dubai project was initiated by Shaikh Mohammad bin Rashid Al Maktoum, vice president of the UAE, which contained more than 100 initiatives to make Dubai a smart city by 2030. The project aimed to integrate the private and public sectors, enabling citizens to access these sectors through their smartphones. Some initiatives include the Dubai Autonomous Transportation Strategy to create driverless transits, fully digitizing government, business and customer information and transactions, and providing citizens 5000 hotspots to access government applications by 2021.

Two mobile applications, mPay and DubaiNow, provide a range of payment services for citizens, from utilities and traffic fines to educational, health, transport, and business services. In addition, the Smart Nol Card is a unified, rechargeable card that enables citizens to pay for all transportation services, including the metro, buses, water buses, and taxis. There is also the Dubai Municipality's Digital City initiative, which assigns each building a unique QR code that citizens can scan to access information about the building, plot, and location.

The Smart City Index 2021, published by the Institute for Management Development and Singapore University of Technology and Design, ranked Dubai and Abu Dhabi as the smartest cities in the region of the Middle East and North Africa, and in positions 28 and 29 worldwide.

=== GIFT City, India ===
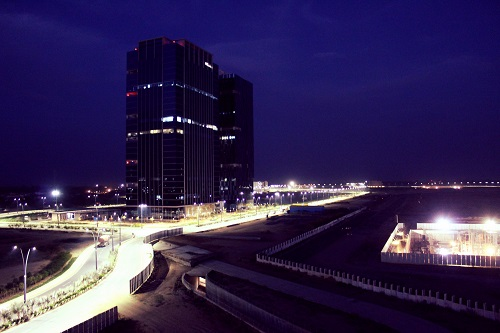
Traffic in GIFT City at night in 2016

GIFT City is India's first operational greenfield smart city. It is being developed as an international financial hub. Work on core infrastructure has fully been completed. It is the first South Asian city which has a centralised district cooling centre and automated solid waste collection system. Many commercial buildings, a school, and the Gujarat Biotechnology University are complete. Work on several residential projects is ongoing. Two international stock exchanges, international banks, and fintech firms are currently operating from this city. IBM opened its software lab in the city in September 2022. Work on GIFT Riverfront started in September 2022.

=== Chennai, India ===
Chennai is the capital of Tamil Nadu which will be developed into a Smart City. The Chennai Smart City project has focused on accomplishing Smart Energy, Smart Water, Smart Environment, Smart Mobility, and Smart Technology. The project successfully rejuvenated 210 water bodies, which improved groundwater levels. The CSC project constructed a suspension glass floor bridge making a stunning tourist attraction. The project plans to make the quality of life in the city better through these initiatives. Work on the CSC project began in 2015 and was expected to finish in June 2024. The CEO of the project is Raj Cherubal.

=== Isfahan, Iran ===
Isfahan has a smart city program, a unified human resources administration system, and transport system.

=== Neom, Saudi Arabia ===
NEOM (Arabic: نيوم) is the name of a future planned city to be built in Tabuk Province in northwestern Saudi Arabia. It is planned to incorporate smart city technologies and to function as a tourist destination. The site is north of the Red Sea, east of Egypt across the Gulf of Aqaba, and south of Jordan. It will cover a total area of 26,500 km^{2} (10,200 sq mi) and will extend 460 km along the coast of the Red Sea.

=== New Songdo City, South Korea ===
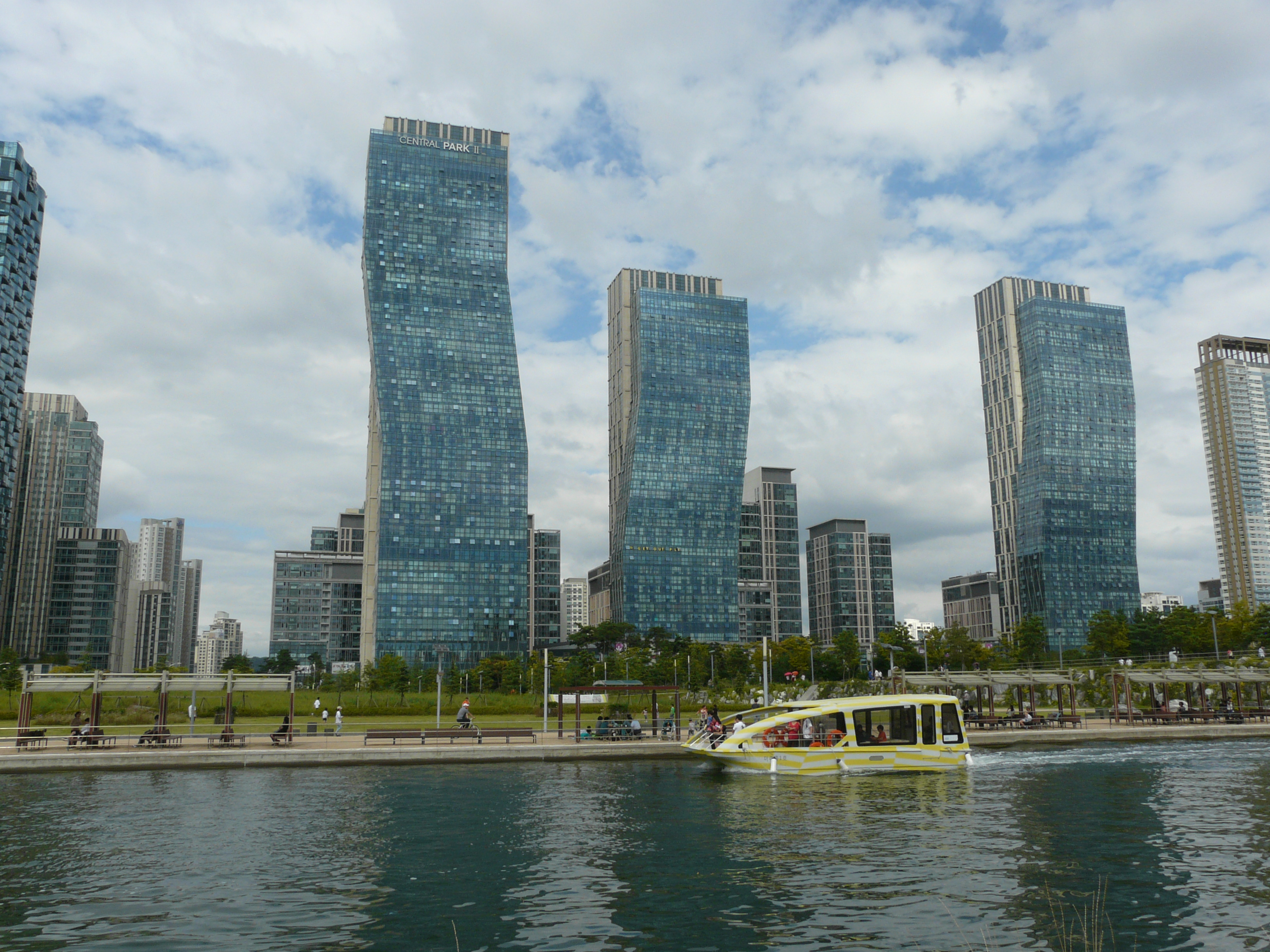
Skyline of Songdo International Business District in 2015

Songdo International Business District is planned to be a smart city.

=== Shanghai, China ===
Shanghai has seen considerable productivity gains from the development of the IoT and high-speed broadband connectivity. During the first China International Import Expo, Shanghai focused on smart mobility and installed sensors to accept smartphone traffic cards at all metro stations and on buses to improve mobility.

=== Singapore ===
Singapore, a city-state, has embarked on transforming into a "Smart Nation" and endeavors to harness the power of networks, data, and information and communication technologies to improve living conditions, create economic opportunities, and build closer communities.

=== Taipei, Taiwan ===
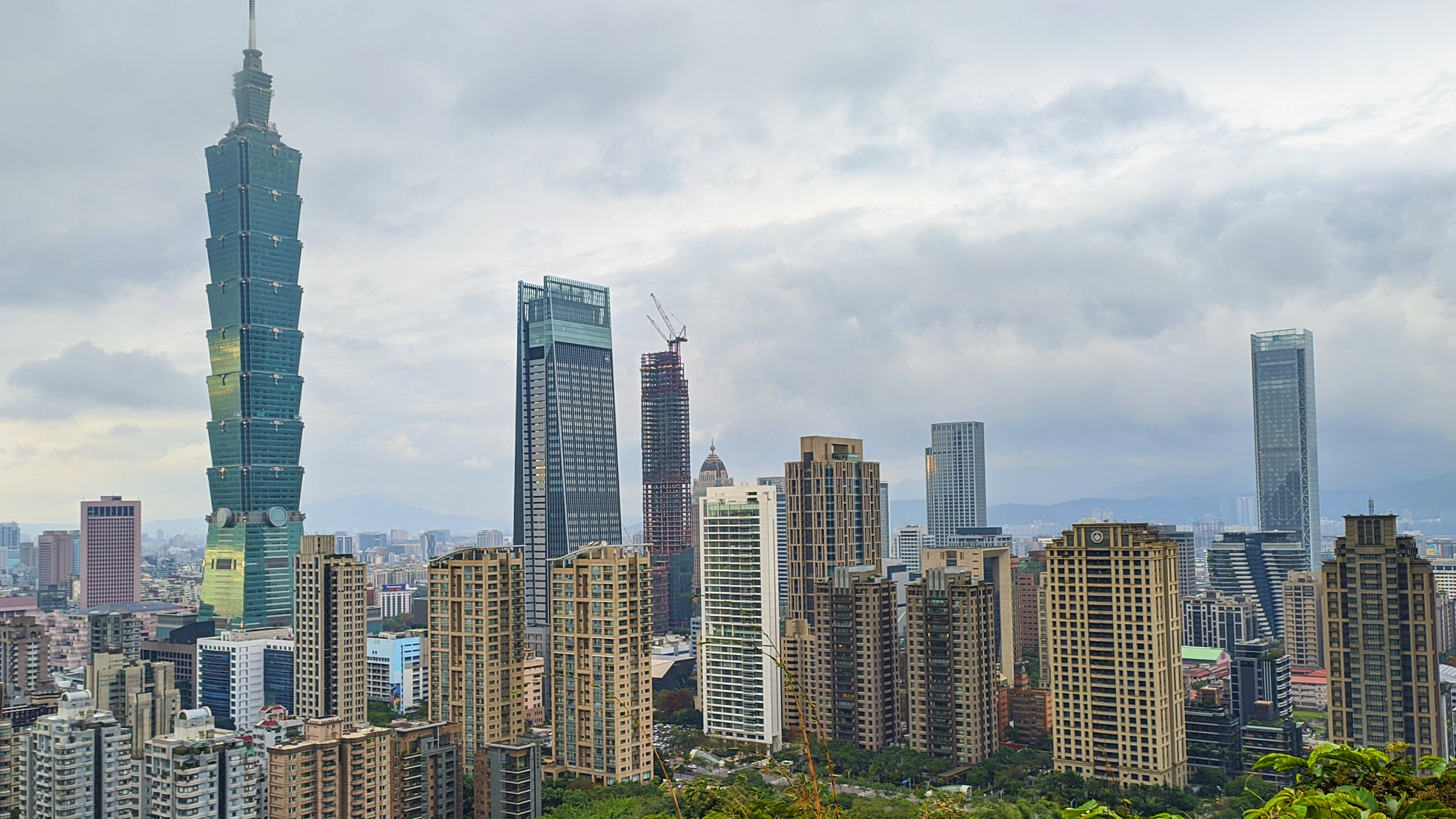
Skyline of Taipei – the first smart city initiative in Taiwan.

Taipei started the "smarttaipei" project in 2016, whose main concept is to change the culture of the city hall government to adopt new ideas and concepts through a bottom-up mechanism. The Taipei City government established the "Taipei Smart City Project Management Office", also known as the "PMO", to implement and govern the development of the smart city. Thereafter, building an innovation matchmaking platform to connect industry and government resources to develop smart solutions that meet public needs.

PMO accepts proposals from industry and helps negotiate with the relevant department of Taipei City to initiate a new proof-of-concept (PoC) project, using a matchmaking platform that allows citizens to access necessary innovative technologies. There are more than 150 PoC Project established, and only 34% project finished.

== Australia ==
=== Brisbane ===
Brisbane launched a project to install poles across the city to monitor key metrics such as air quality and environmental noise. The information they collect is used by the city council to improve operations around the city. They also serve as street lights, have outlets for charging, and Wi-Fi.

In 2023, the Salisbury smart cities controversy arose after a proposal for smart city technology in the South Australian local government area of City of Salisbury was met with community backlash, leading to a range of conspiracy theories.

== Europe ==
=== Amsterdam, Netherlands ===
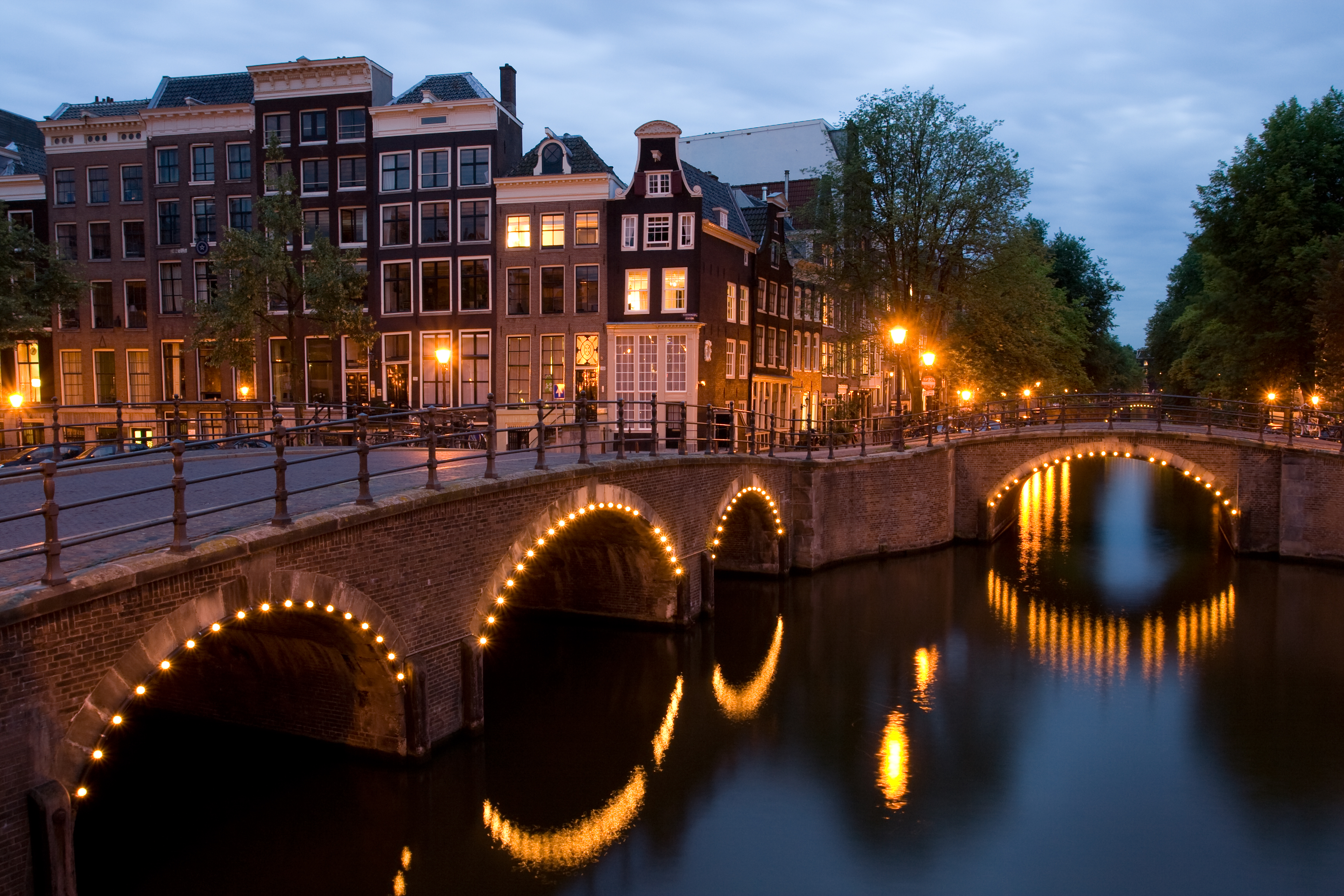
Street lamps in Amsterdam have been upgraded to allow municipal councils to dim the lights based on pedestrian usage.

The Amsterdam smart city initiative, which began in 2009, currently includes 170+ projects developed collaboratively by local residents, the government, and businesses. These projects run on an interconnected platform through wireless devices to enhance the city's real-time decision-making abilities.

To promote efforts from local residents, the City runs the Amsterdam Smart City Challenge annually, accepting proposals for applications and developments that fit within the city's framework. An example of a resident developed app is Mobypark, which allows owners of parking spaces to rent them out to people for a fee. The data generated from this app can then be used by the city to determine parking demand and traffic flows in Amsterdam. A number of homes have also been equipped with smart energy meters, and incentives are available for those who actively reduce energy consumption.

Other initiatives include flexible street lighting (smart lighting) which allows municipalities to control the brightness of street lights, and smart traffic management where traffic is monitored in real time by the city and information about current travel time on certain roads is broadcast to allow motorists to determine the best routes to take. The City of Amsterdam claims the purpose of the projects is to reduce traffic, save energy, and improve public safety.

=== Barcelona, Spain ===
Barcelona has established several projects that can be considered 'smart city' applications as part of its "CityOS" strategy. For example, sensor technology has been implemented in the irrigation system in Parc del Centre de Poblenou, where real time data is transmitted to gardening crews about the level of water required for the plants. Barcelona has also designed a new bus network based on data analysis of the most common traffic flows in Barcelona, utilising primarily vertical, horizontal and diagonal routes with a number of interchanges. Integration of multiple smart city technologies can be seen through the implementation of smart traffic lights as buses run on routes designed to optimise the number of green lights. In addition, when an emergency is reported in Barcelona, the approximate route of the emergency vehicle is entered into the traffic light system, setting all the lights to green as the vehicle approaches through a mix of GPS and traffic management software, allowing emergency services to reach the incident without delay. Much of this data is managed by the Sentilo Platform.

=== Copenhagen, Denmark ===
In 2014, Copenhagen claimed the prestigious World Smart Cities Award for its "Connecting Copenhagen" smart city development strategy. Positioned in the Technical and Environmental Administration of Copenhagen, the smart city initiatives are coordinated by Copenhagen Solutions Lab, the city's administrative unit for smart city development. There are other notable actors in Greater Copenhagen that coordinate and initiate smart city initiatives, including State of Green and Gate21, the latter of which has initiated the innovation hub smart city Cluster Denmark.

In an article with The Economist, a current major smart city project is explained: "In Copenhagen, as in many cities around the world, air quality is high on the agenda when it comes to liveability, with 68 percent of citizens citing it as of high importance when it comes to what makes their city attractive. To monitor pollution levels, Copenhagen Solutions Lab is currently working with Google and has installed monitoring equipment in their streetview car in order to produce a heatmap of air quality around the city. The information will help cyclists and joggers plan routes with the best air quality. The project also gives a glimpse of the future, when this kind of information could be collected in real time by sensors all over the city and collated with traffic flow data."

In another article with The World Economic Forum, Marius Sylvestersen, Program Director at Copenhagen Solutions Lab, explains that public-private collaborations must be built on transparency and a willingness to share data, and be driven by the same set of values. This requires a particularly open mindset from the organisations that wish to get involved. To facilitate open collaboration and knowledge-sharing, Copenhagen Solutions Lab launched the Copenhagen Street Lab in 2016. Here, organisations such as TDC, Citelum, and Cisco collaborate with Copenhagen Solutions Lab to identify new solutions to city and citizen problems.

=== Dublin, Ireland ===
Dublin has been referred to as an unexpected capital for smart cities. The smart city programme for the city is run by Smart Dublin an initiative of the four Dublin Local Authorities to engage with smart technology providers, researchers and citizens to solve city challenges and improve city life. It includes Dublinked - Dublin's open data platform that hosts open-source data for smart city applications.

=== Gdynia, Poland ===
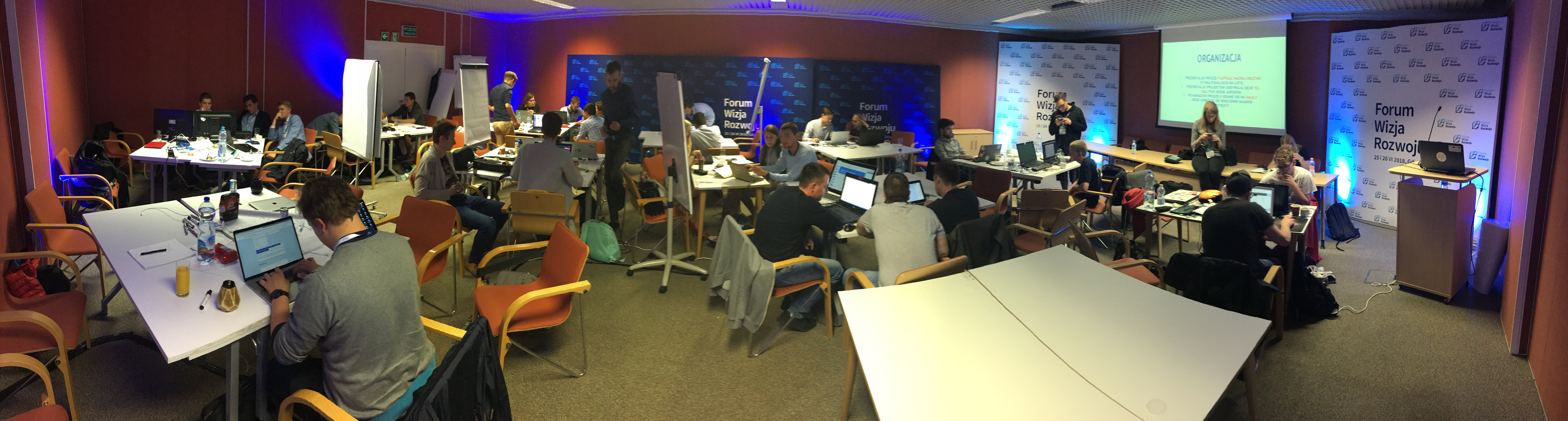
A 2018 smart city-themed hackathon in Gdynia

Gdynia was the first city in Eastern Europe to receive the ISO 37120 certificate issued by the World Council on City Data. In 2015, the TRISTAR intelligent road traffic management system was implemented in the city. Trolleybuses in Gdynia have been operating since 1943 and are still being developed as low-emission transport - some of them have their own batteries, which allows them to reach areas with no traction.

Over 200 sets of up-to-date data from 21 areas of the city's functioning are published on the Open Data portal. The data sets meet the requirements for machine readability and are also presented in a way that is comprehensible to users. There is also an Urban Lab that fosters cooperation among residents, experts, and representatives of city structures.

=== Kyiv, Ukraine ===
Kyiv has a transport dispatch system. It contains GPS trackers installed on public transportation and 6,000 video surveillance cameras that monitor traffic. The accrued data is used by the local Traffic Management Service and transport application developers.

=== London, UK ===
In London, a traffic management system known as SCOOT optimizes green light timing at traffic intersections by feeding magnetometer and inductive loop data to a supercomputer, which coordinates traffic lights across the city to improve traffic flow.

=== Madrid, Spain ===
Madrid, Spain's pioneering smart city, has adopted the MiNT Madrid Inteligente/Smarter Madrid platform to integrate the management of local services. These include the sustainable and computerized management of infrastructure, garbage collection and recycling, and public spaces and green areas, among others. The programme is run in partnership with IBMs INSA, making use of the latter's Big Data and analytics capabilities and experience. Madrid is considered to have taken a bottom-up approach to smart cities, whereby social issues are first identified and individual technologies or networks are then identified to address these issues. This approach includes support and recognition for start ups through the Madrid Digital Start Up programme.

=== Malta ===
A document written in 2011 refers to 18th century Żejtun as the earliest "smart city" in Malta, but not in the modern context of a smart city. By the 21st century, SmartCity Malta, a planned technology park, was partially operational, with the rest under construction, as a Foreign Direct Investment.

=== Manchester, UK ===
In December 2015, Manchester's CityVerve project was chosen as the winner of a government-led technology competition and awarded £10m to develop an Internet of Things (IoT) smart cities demonstrator.

Established in July 2016, the project is being carried out by a consortium of 22 public and private organisations, including Manchester City Council, and is aligned with the city's on-going devolution commitment.

The project has a two-year remit to demonstrate the capabilities of IoT applications and address barriers to deploying smart cities, such as city governance, network security, user trust and adoption, interoperability, scalability, and the justification of investment.

CityVerve is based on an open data principle that incorporates a "platform of platforms" which ties together applications for its four key themes: transport and travel; health and social care; energy and the environment; culture and the public realm. This will also ensure that the project is scalable and able to be redeployed to other locations worldwide.

=== Milan, Italy ===
Milan was prompted to begin its smart city strategies and initiatives by the European Union's Smart Cities and Communities initiative. However, unlike many European cities, Milan's Smart city strategies focus more on social than on environmental sustainability. This focus is almost exclusive to Milan and has a major influence on the way content and the way its strategies are implemented, as shown in the case study of the Bicocca District in Milan.

=== Milton Keynes, UK ===
Milton Keynes is committed to becoming a smart city. Currently, the mechanism through which this is being approached is the MK:Smart initiative, a collaboration among local government, businesses, academia, and 3rd-sector organisations. The focus of the initiative is on making energy use, water use, and transport more sustainable whilst promoting economic growth in the city. Central to the project is the creation of a state-of-the-art 'MK Data Hub' which will support the acquisition and management of vast amounts of data relevant to city systems from a variety of data sources. These will include data on energy and water consumption, transport data, data acquired via satellite technology, social and economic datasets, and crowdsourced data from social media or specialised apps.

The MK:Smart initiative has two aspects that extend our understanding of how smart Cities should operate. The first, Our MK, is a scheme to promote citizen-led sustainability initiatives in the city. The scheme provides funding and support to engage with citizens and help turn their ideas around sustainability into a reality. The second aspect is in providing citizens with the skills to operate effectively in a smart city. The Urban Data School is an online platform that teaches school students data skills, and the project has also produced a MOOC to inform citizens about what a smart city is.

=== Moscow, Russia ===
Moscow has been implementing smart solutions since 2011, building the core infrastructure and local networks. Over the past few years, the Moscow government has implemented several programs that have contributed to its IT development. So, the Information City program was launched and subsequently implemented from 2012 to 2018. The initial purpose of the programme was to make daily life for citizens safe and comfortable through the large-scale introduction of information and communication technologies.

In the summer of 2018, Moscow Mayor Sergey Sobyanin announced the city's smart city project, aimed at applying modern technologies in all areas of city life. In June 2018, the global management consultancy McKinsey announced that Moscow is one of the world's top 50 cities for smart technologies.

Smart City technologies have been deployed in healthcare, education, transport, and municipal services. The initiative aims to improve quality of life, make urban government more efficient, and develop an information society. There are more than 300 digital initiatives within the smart city project, with electronic services now widely provided online and through multifunctional centers. Moscow's citywide Wi-Fi project was launched in 2012 and now provides more than 16,000 Wi-Fi internet access points. The total number of access points will exceed 20,500 by early 2021. Moscow is actively developing eco-friendly transport using electric buses, and autonomous cars will soon be tested on the city's streets. Other initiatives include Moscow's Electronic School programme, its blockchain-based Active Citizen project, and smart traffic management.

=== Santander, Spain ===
The city of Santander in Cantabria, northern Spain, has 20,000 sensors connecting buildings, infrastructure, transport, networks, and utilities, and offers a physical space for experimentation and validation of the IoT functions, such as interaction and management protocols, device technologies, and support services such as discovery, identity management, and security. In Santander, the sensors monitor the levels of pollution, noise, traffic and parking.

=== Stockholm, Sweden ===
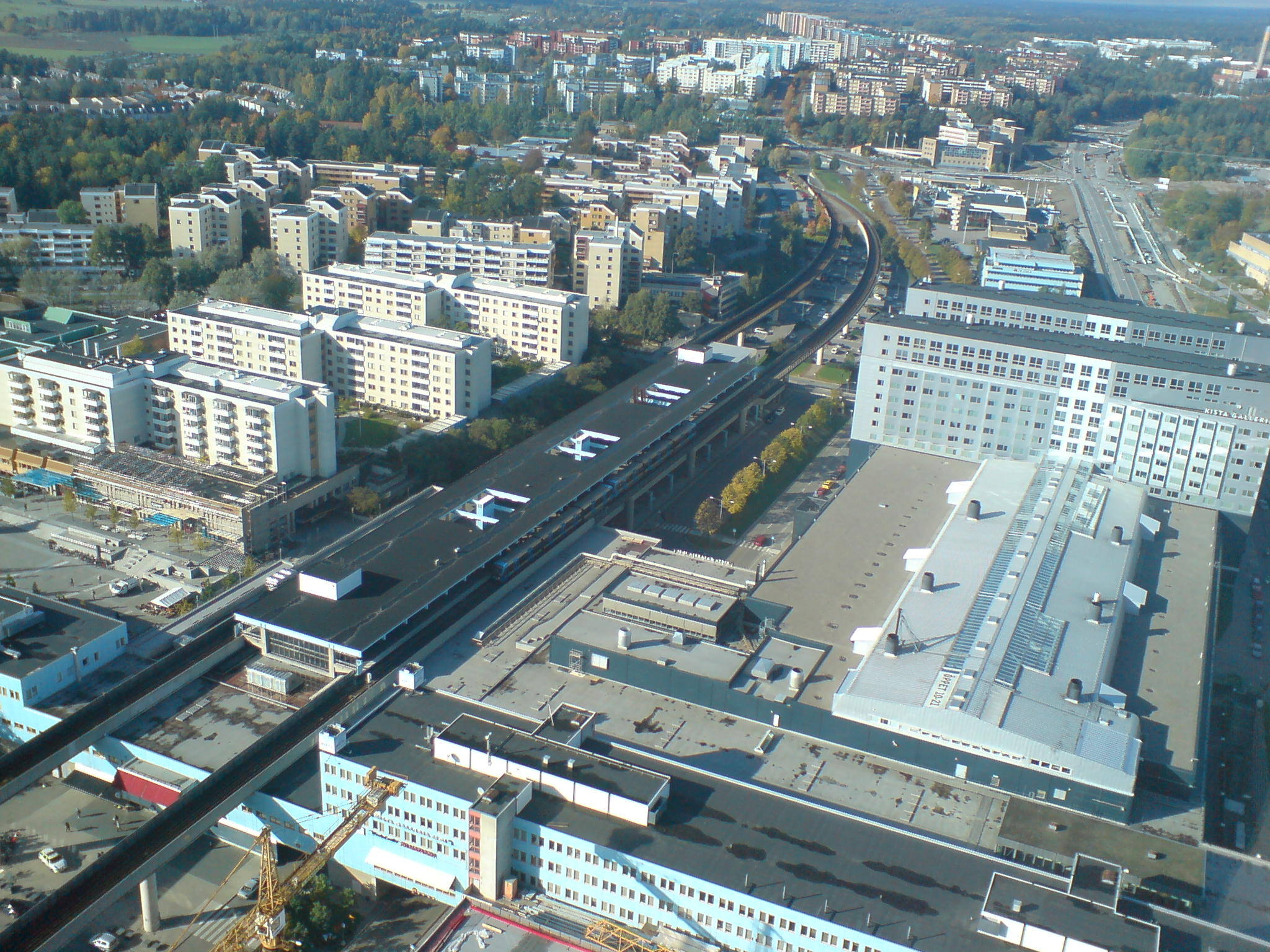
The Kista Science City from above.

Stockholm's smart city technology is underpinned by the Stokab dark fibre system which was developed in 1994 to provide a universal fibre optic network across Stockholm. Private companies are able to lease fibre as service providers on equal terms. The company is owned by the City of Stockholm itself. Within this framework, Stockholm has created a Green IT strategy. The Green IT program seeks to reduce the environmental impact of Stockholm through IT functions such as energy efficient buildings (minimising heating costs), traffic monitoring (minimising the time spent on the road) and development of e-services (minimising paper usage). The e-Stockholm platform is centred on the provision of e-services, including political announcements, parking space booking and snow clearance. This is further being developed through GPS analytics, allowing residents to plan their route through the city. An example of district-specific smart city technology can be found in the Kista Science City region. This region is based on the triple helix concept of smart cities, where university, industry and government work together to develop computing applications for implementation in a smart city strategy.

=== Tallinn, Estonia ===
Tallinn was a recipient in 2020 of the Netexplo Smart Cities 2020 Prize for digital transformation. Since 2013, Tallinn has offered free public transit to its residents, coordinated through pairing of contactless fare cards with national identity cards via digital public portal. Tallinn also hosts the FinEst Centre for Smart Cities, a collaborative research institution that investigates autonomous public transport and smart grid solutions. The nation of Estonia has a program called e-Estonia, which allows for transnational digital residency and electronic voting.

== North America ==
=== United States ===
==== Columbus, Ohio ====
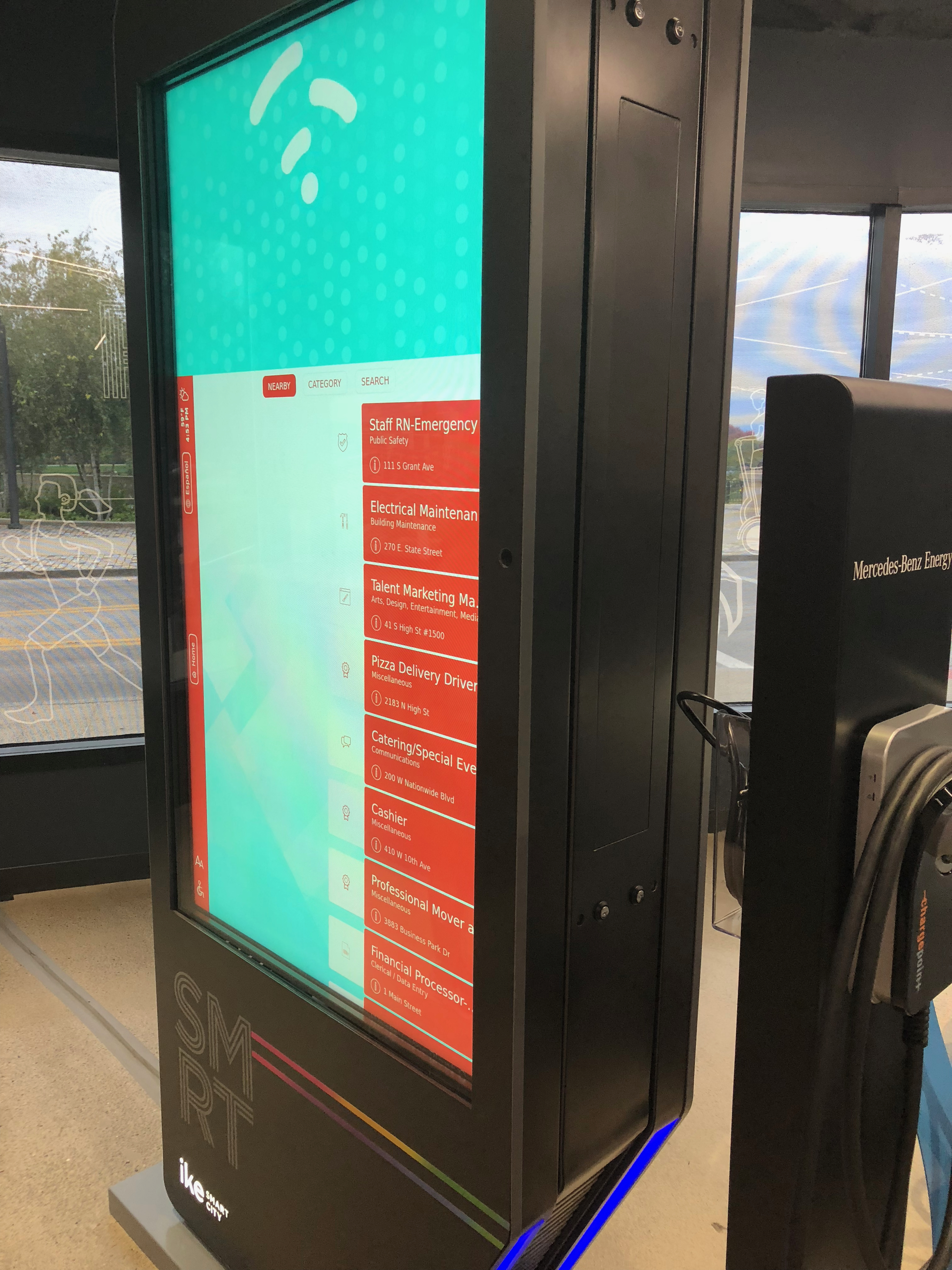
A smart kiosk and EV charger in Columbus, Ohio, U.S.

In the summer of 2017, the City of Columbus, Ohio, began its pursuit of a smart city initiative. The city partnered with American Electric Power Ohio to create a group of new electric vehicle charging stations. Many smart cities, such as Columbus, are using agreements like this one to prepare for climate change, expand electric infrastructure, convert existing public vehicle fleets to electric vehicles, and create incentives for people to share rides when commuting. To do this, the U.S. Department of Transportation awarded the City of Columbus a $40 million grant. The city also received $10 million from Vulcan Inc.

One key reason the utility was involved in selecting locations for new electric vehicle charging stations was to gather data. According to Daily Energy Insider, the group Infrastructure and Business Continuity for AEP said, "You don't want to put infrastructure where it won't be used or maintained. The data we collect will help us build a much bigger market in the future."

Because autonomous vehicles are currently seeing "an increased industrial research and legislative push globally", building routes and connections for them is another important part of the Columbus smart city initiative.

==== New York City, New York ====
New York is developing several smart city initiatives. An example is the series of city service kiosks in the LinkNYC network. These provide services, including free WiFi, phone calls, device charging stations, local wayfinding, and more, funded by advertising displayed on the kiosks' screens.

==== San Leandro, California ====
The city of San Leandro is in the midst of transforming from an industrial center to a tech hub of the Internet of things (IoT) (technology that lets devices communicate with each other over the Internet). California's utility company PG&E is working with the city on a smart energy pilot program to develop a distributed energy network across the city, monitored by IoT sensors. The goal would be to give the city an energy system with sufficient capacity to receive and redistribute electricity from and to multiple energy sources.

==== Santa Cruz, California ====
In Santa Cruz, local authorities previously analyzed historical crime data in order to predict police requirements and maximize police presence where it is required. The analytical tools generate a list of 10 places each day where property crimes are more likely to occur, and then placing police efforts on these regions when officers are not responding to any emergency. The city of Santa Cruz banned the use of predictive policing technology in 2020 largely due to accusations of the system's having racial prejudice.
