= Val IT =

Governance framework for IT management

Val IT is a governance framework developed by ISACA that can help a company show the business value from its IT investments. It has been designed to help executives ensure that investments in IT deliver business value. Val IT is closely related to the COBIT framework also developed by ISACA.

Val IT consists of a set of guiding principles and a number of processes and best practices that are further defined as a set of key management practices to support and help executive management and boards at an enterprise level.

== History ==
The Val IT Framework was developed by the IT Governance Institute (ITGI), an affiliate of ISACA, and first edition (1.0) was released in March 2006. It was created as a business-centric complement to COBIT 4.0 to address value creation from IT-enabled investments.

In July 2008, version 2.0 was release. This update increased the framework to 22 IT-related business processes and further aligned its structure with COBIT. It was based on the experience of global practitioners and academics, practices and methodologies. It was named Enterprise Value: Governance of IT Investments, The Val IT Framework 2.0. It covers processes and key management practices for three specific domains and goes beyond new investments to include IT services, assets, other resources and principles and processes for IT portfolio management.

The framework was eventually integrated with Risk IT and COBIT 4.1 to form the comprehensive COBIT 5 framework in 2012.

== Structure ==
Val IT allows business managers to understand how to get value from IT investments, by providing a governance framework that consists of:

- a set of guiding principles, and
- a number of processes conforming to those principles that are further defined as a set of key management practices.

The major domains are:

- Value Governance (VG prefix)
- Portfolio Management (PM prefix)
- Investment Management (IM prefix)

=== Relationship to COBIT ===
Val IT is tightly integrated with COBIT Version 4, also from the Information Systems Audit and Control Association (ISACA). The Framework document explains the difference between COBIT and Val IT as follows:

Val IT extends and complements COBIT, which provides a comprehensive control framework for IT governance. Specifically, Val IT focuses on the investment decision (are we doing the right things?) and the realisation of benefits (are we getting the benefits?), while COBIT focuses on the execution (are we doing them the right way, and are we getting them done well?)

=== Relationship to VMM ===
Value Measuring Methodology (VMM), which has the motto "it's not just about ROI any more", provides more specific guidance than Val IT about:

- the different types of value (tangible and intangible) that can be considered; and
- how to compare the "apples" (tangibles) with "oranges" (intangibles) from individual projects to help maintain balance.

== Major Processes ==
Each of the following major processes/activities have a responsibility assignment (RACI) matrix, indicating the responsibilities of the senior executives, business managers, and information managers, along with the major and minor COBIT control objectives associated with the activity.

=== Value Governance ===
- VG1: Establish informed and committed leadership.
- VG2: Define and implement processes.
- VG3: Define portfolio characteristics.
- VG4: Align and integrate value management with enterprise financial planning.
- VG5: Establish effective governance monitoring.
- VG6: Continuously improve value management practices.

=== Portfolio Management ===
- PM1: Establish strategic direction and target investment mix.
- PM2: Determine the availability and sources of funds.
- PM3: Manage the availability of human resources.
- PM4: Evaluate and select programmes to fund.
- PM5: Monitor and report on investment portfolio performance.
- PM6: Optimise portfolio performance.

=== Investment Management ===
- IM1: Develop and evaluate the initial programme concept business case.
- IM2: Understand the candidate programme and implementation options.
- IM3: Develop the programme plan.
- IM4: Develop full life-cycle costs and benefits.
- IM5: Develop the detailed candidate programme business case.
- IM6: Launch and manage the programme.
- IM7: Update operational IT portfolios.
- IM8: Update the business case.
- IM9: Monitor and report on the programme.
- IM10: Retire the programme.

== See also ==
- IT Governance
- IT Portfolio Management
- Earned value management
- Value network analysis
- Value theory
- Value Measuring Methodology
