= Chris Verhoef =

Dutch computer scientist (born 1962)

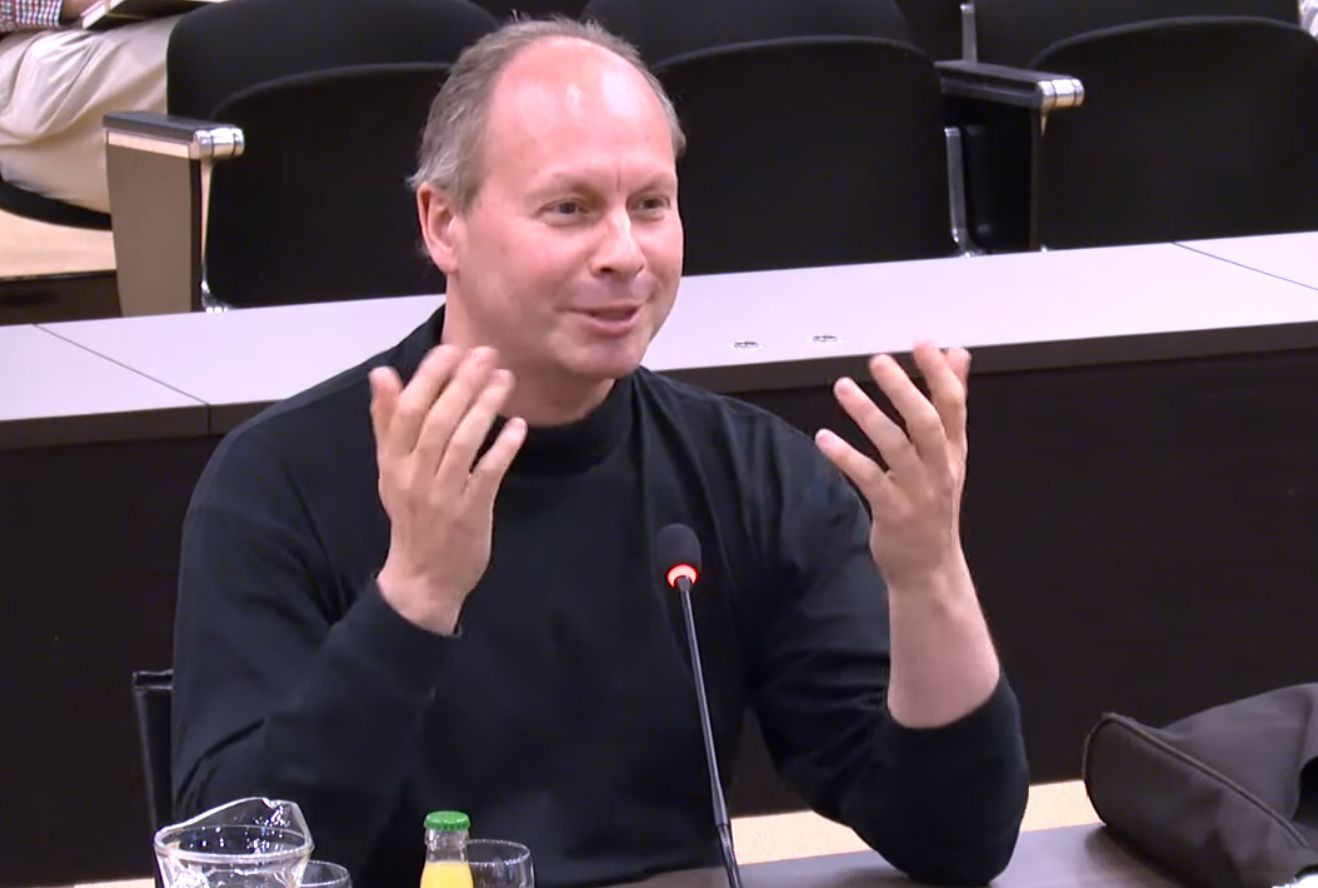
- Commission ICT - Hearing Day 1 - Chris Verhoef, 2014
- Born: Christopher Verhoef; 1962 (age 63–64)
- Education: University of Amsterdam
- Known for: Structured operational semantics
- Scientific career
- Fields: Computer Science
- Workplaces: Vrije Universiteit
- Website: Homepage at cs.vu.nl

Christopher (Chris) Verhoef (born 1962) is a Dutch computer scientist, and Professor of Computer Science at the Vrije Universiteit in Amsterdam.

== Biography ==
Born in Kedichem in 1962, Verhoef received his PhD in computer science at the University of Amsterdam in 1992 under supervision of Jan Bergstra with the thesis "Linear unary operators in process algebra."

Verhoef had done his graduate work at the Programming Research Group of the University of Amsterdam, where in 1990 he had published his first report "On the register operator." Early 1990s he joined the Department of Mathematics and Computing Science of Eindhoven University of Technology. One of his first research interests was the Algebra of Communicating Processes, an "algebraic theory to describe processes that can communicate." This field was initially developed by Jan Bergstra and Jan Willem Klop in 1982. With Alban Ponse and Bas van Vlijmen, Verhoef initiated the first two International Workshops on the Algebra of Communicating Processes in 1994 and 1995.

In 1996/97 he returned to Programming Research Group of the University of Amsterdam, where he started focussing on Reverse engineering, the "theory and practice of recovering information from existing software and systems." In 1997 he co-chaired the Fourth IEEE Computer Society Working Conference on Reverse Engineering.

Since early 2000s Verhoef is Professor of Computer Science at the Vrije Universiteit in Amsterdam. His research interests further extend in the fields of the structured operational semantics, and IT Portfolio Management.

== Selected publications ==
Articles, a selection.

- Verhoef, Chris. "A congruence theorem for structured operational semantics with predicates and negative premises." Nordic Journal of Computing 2.2 (1995): 274-302.
- Aceto, Luca, Wan Fokkink, and Chris Verhoef. Structural operational semantics. BRICS, Department of Computer Science, University of Aarhus, 1999.
- Lämmel, Ralf, and Chris Verhoef. "Semi-automatic grammar recovery." Software: Practice and Experience 31.15 (2001): 1395-1438.
- Klint, Paul, Ralf Lämmel, and Chris Verhoef. "Toward an engineering discipline for grammarware." ACM Transactions on Software Engineering and Methodology (TOSEM) 14.3 (2005): 331-380.
- Eveleens, J. Laurenz, and Chris Verhoef. "The rise and fall of the chaos report figures." IEEE software 27.1 (2010): 30-36.
