= Information quality management =

Information quality management is an information technology (IT) management discipline encompassing elements of quality management, information management and knowledge management. It further encompasses the COBIT information criteria of efficiency, effectiveness, confidentiality, integrity, availability, compliance and reliability. The idea is for companies to have the risks of using a program diminished to protect private and sensitive information.

It is held by some that the separation of software engineering, infrastructure management, and information security management leads to difficulties and failures. These failures occur especially when communication is needed between these two sectors

Thus, leading edge companies are starting to integrate these information quality management disciplines along with the discipline of information risk management. These two disciplines ensure that software engineering frameworks of the future have established information security controls in place before the project commences.
