= IT portfolio management =

Application of systematic management

IT portfolio management is the application of systematic management to the investments, projects and activities of enterprise Information Technology (IT) departments. Examples of IT portfolios would be planned initiatives, projects, and ongoing IT services (such as application support). The promise of IT portfolio management is the quantification of previously informal IT efforts, enabling measurement and objective evaluation of investment scenarios.

== Overview ==
Debates exist on the best way to measure value of IT investment. As pointed out by Jeffery and Leliveld, companies have spent billions of dollars on IT investments and yet the headlines of mis-spent money are not uncommon. Nicholas Carr (2003) has caused significant controversy in IT industry and academia by positioning IT as an expense similar to utilities such as electricity.

IT portfolio management started with a project-centric bias, but is evolving to include steady-state portfolio entries such as infrastructure and application maintenance. IT budgets tend not to track these efforts at a sufficient level of granularity for effective financial tracking.

The concept is analogous to financial portfolio management, but there are significant differences. Financial portfolio assets typically have consistent measurement information (enabling accurate and objective comparisons), and this is at the base of the concept’s usefulness in application to IT. However, achieving such universality of measurement is going to take considerable effort in the IT industry (see, for example, Val IT). IT investments are not liquid, like stocks and bonds (although investment portfolios may also include illiquid assets), and are measured using both financial and non-financial yardsticks (for example, a balanced scorecard approach); a purely financial view is not sufficient. Finally, assets in an IT portfolio have a functional relationship to the organization, such as an inventory management system for logistics or a human resources system for tracking employees' time. This is analogous to a vertically integrated company which may own an oil field, a refinery, and retail gas stations.

IT portfolio management is distinct from IT financial management in that it has an explicitly directive, strategic goal in determining what to continue investing in versus what to divest from.

At its most mature, IT portfolio management is accomplished through the creation of three portfolios:

- Application Portfolio - Management of this portfolio focuses on comparing spending on established systems based upon their relative value to the organization. The comparison can be based upon the level of contribution in terms of IT investment’s profitability. Additionally, this comparison can also be based upon the non-tangible factors such as organizations’ level of experience with a certain technology, users’ familiarity with the applications and infrastructure, and external forces such as emergence of new technologies and obsolescence of old ones.
- Infrastructure Portfolio - For an organization's information technology, infrastructure management (IM) is the management of essential operation components, such as policies, processes, equipment, data, human resources, and external contacts, for overall effectiveness. Infrastructure management is sometimes divided into categories of systems management, network management, and storage management. The ability of organizations to exploit IT infrastructure, operations and management sourcing/service solutions not only depends on the availability, cost and effectiveness of applications and services, but also with coming to terms with solution providers, and managing the entire sourcing process. In the rush to reduce costs, increase IT quality and increase competitiveness by way of selective IT sourcing and services, many organizations do not consider the management side of the equation. The predictable result of this neglect is overpayment, cost overruns, unmet expectations and outright failure.
- Project Portfolio - This type of portfolio management specially addresses the issues with spending on the development of innovative capabilities in terms of potential ROI, reducing investment overlaps in situations where reorganization or acquisition occurs, or complying with legal or regulatory mandates. The management issues with project-oriented portfolio management can be judged by criteria such as ROI, strategic alignment, data cleanliness, maintenance savings, suitability of resulting solution and the relative value of new investments to replace these projects.

Information Technology portfolio management as a systematic discipline is more applicable to larger IT organizations; in smaller organizations its concerns might be generalized into IT planning and governance as a whole.

== Benefits of using IT portfolio management ==
Jeffery and Leliveld (2004) have listed several benefits of applying IT portfolio management approach for IT investments. They argue that agility of portfolio management is its biggest advantage over investment approaches and methods. Other benefits include central oversight of budget, risk management, strategic alignment of IT investments, demand and investment management along with standardization of investment procedure, rules and plans.

== Implementing IT portfolio management ==
Jeffery and Leliveld (2004) have pointed out a number of hurdles and success factors that CIOs might face while attempting to implement IT portfolio management approach. To overcome these hurdles, simple methods such as proposed by Pisello (2001) can be used.

       -Plan-
     -        -
   -            -
  build      retire
   -            -
      -      -  
      Maintain

Other implementation methods include (1) risk profile analysis (figure out what needs to be measured and what risks are associated with it), (2) Decide on the Diversification of projects, infrastructure and technologies (it is an important tool that IT portfolio management provides to judge the level of investments on the basis of how investments should be made in various elements of the portfolio), (3) Continuous Alignment with business goals (highest levels of organizations should have a buy-in in the portfolio) and (4) Continuous Improvement (lessons learned and investment adjustments).

1. Developing and evolving IT portfolio governance and organization
2. Assessing IT portfolio management process execution

There is no single best way to implement IT portfolio approach and therefore variety of approaches can applied. Obviously the methods are not set in stone and will need altering depending upon the individual circumstances of different organizations.

== IT portfolio management vs. balanced scorecard ==
The biggest advantage of IT portfolio management is the agility of the investment adjustments. While balanced scorecards also emphasize the use of vision and strategy in any investment decision, oversight and control of operation budgets is not the goal. IT portfolio management allows organizations to adjust the investments based upon the feedback mechanism built into the IT portfolio management.

== History ==
The first mention of the portfolio concept as related to IT was from Richard Nolan in 1973: "investments in developing computer applications can be thought of as a portfolio of computer applications."

Further mention is found in Gibson and Nolan's Managing the Four Stages of EDP Growth in 1973. Gibson and Nolan proposed that IT advances in observable stages driven by four "growth processes" of which the Applications Portfolio was key. Their concepts were operationalized at Nolan, Norton & Co. with measures of application coverage of business functions, applications functional and technical qualities, applications age and spending.

McFarlan proposed a different portfolio management approach to IT assets and investments. Further contributions have been made by Weill and Broadbent, Aitken, Kaplan, and Benson, Bugnitz, and Walton. The ITIL version 2 Business Perspective and Application Management volumes and the ITIL v3 Service Strategy volume also cover it in depth.

Various vendors have offerings explicitly branded as "IT Portfolio Management" solutions.

ISACA's Val IT framework is perhaps the first attempt at standardization of IT portfolio management principles.

In peer-reviewed research, Christopher Verhoef has found that IT portfolios statistically behave more akin to biological populations than financial portfolios. Verhoef was general chair of the first convening of the new IEEE conference, "IEEE Equity," March 2007, which focuses on "quantitative methods for measuring, predicting, and understanding the relationship between IT and value."

=== McFarlan's IT portfolio matrix ===
		High
		^
		|---------------------------------------------------------------|
		|Strategic			| Turnaround			|
Impact		|---------------------------------------------------------------|
of IS/IT	|Critical to achieving		|May be critical to 		|
applications	|future business strategy.	|achieving future 		|
on future 	|	(Developer)		|business success		|
       industry	|		                |	(Entrepreneur)		|
competitiveness	|Central Planning		|				|
		|				|Leading Edge/Free Market	|
		|---------------------------------------------------------------|
		|Critical to existing business 	|Valuable but not critical	|
		|operations			|to success			|
		|	(Controller)		|	(Caretaker)		|
		|				|				|
		|Monopoly			|  Scarce Resource		|
		|_______________________________| ______________________________|
		|Factory		        | Support			|
		|<---------------------------------------------------------------Low
		High 			
	
		Value to the business of existing applications.

== Freeware and open source tools ==
MappIT is a free tool used to map and analyze IT SEC Portfolio assets (systems, business processes, infrastructure, people, skills, roles, organization, spending...) and their lifecycle. It was launched in its first version in February 2012.

The PfM² Portfolio Management Methodology is an open source Portfolio Management Methodology published by the PM² Foundation under the Creative Commons Attribution Non-Commercial ShareAlike 4.0 International licence. It is based on, and expands the European Commission's PM² Methodological Framework, and presents an effective standalone portfolio management methodology. The PfM² Guide encapsulates globally accepted best practices from other methods and standards and provides them in the form of guidelines that are lean, user-centric and that effectively communicate the PfM² Model to a broad and varied audience.

== Relationship to other IT disciplines ==
IT portfolio management is an enabling technique for the objectives of IT Governance. It is related to both IT Service Management and Enterprise Architecture, and is seen as a bridge between the two. ITIL v3 calls for Service Portfolio Management which appears to be functionally equivalent.

== Difference between projects, programs and portfolios ==
A project is managed with a clear end date in mind, and according to a set scope and budget. It has a single easily definable tangible output. E.g. a list of deliverables, a new system or an improved process. The Management of Portfolios (MoP) standard of AXELOS defines a project as "... a temporary organization, usually existing for a much shorter time than a programme, which will deliver one or more outputs in accordance with a specific business case. A particular project may or may not be part of a programme."

A program is a collection of two or more projects sharing a common goal. Program managers control dependencies and allocate resources across projects. The MoP and Management of Successful Programmes (MSP) standards define a programme as "... a temporary, flexible organization created to coordinate, direct and oversee the implementation of a set of related projects and activities in order to deliver outcomes and benefits related to the organizations's strategic objectives. A programme is likely to have a life that spans several years."

A portfolio is a group of related initiatives, projects and/or programs that attain wide reaching benefits and impact. MoP definition: "An organization's portfolio is the totality of its investment (or segment therof) in the changes required to achieve its strategic objectives. ...focus is on the change initiatives that are delivered via formalized project and programme management methodologies."

== See also ==
- Application Portfolio Management
- Enterprise Architecture
- Integrated Business Planning
- IT Governance
- Project Portfolio Management
- Val IT
