= Value measuring methodology =

Tool for making investment decisions

Value measuring methodology (VMM) is a tool that helps financial planners balance both tangible and intangible values when making investment decisions, and monitor benefits.

Formal methods to calculate the Return on investment (ROI) have been widely understood and used for a long time, but there was no easy and widely known way to provide a formal justification for decisions based on intangible values, which can include the reputation of an organization, the wellbeing of staff, or the impact on society or the environment at large. It was particularly difficult for decision makers to work through the trade-offs between costs and intangible benefits, especially for long-term investments by commercial organizations, and for governments and non-profit organizations who are primarily concerned with intangible values without wasting limited funds. Even within commercial organizations, units traditionally viewed as "cost centres" found it difficult to get acceptance of proposals for projects that would lead to general and long-term efficiency or capability gains, as the benefits were difficult to assign to "profit centres".

The approach of the VMM is to start by developing a framework of values, including costs, risks, tangible returns and intangible returns, then assign scores to each element in the framework. Once the relative scores of the different types of values are assigned and agreed, it becomes possible to examine alternatives and give yes/no decisions in a fairly objective and repeatable manner, and review progress using a range of traditional quantitative program management techniques. As well as allowing comparison of different values within a project, the quantitative approach of the VMM permits review of the total contribution to a particular value across a range of projects.

== History and Adoption ==
VMM was developed by the General Services Administration's (GSA) Office of Government-wide Policy (OGP) in collaboration with Harvard University. The VMM was first articulated in a report by Booz Allen Hamilton in 2002 for the US Social Security Administration, as part of an electronic services project.

It was popularized by a suite of documents released by the US Federal Chief Information Officers Council in 2003, which give detailed guidance to agencies helping them to seek funding and plan budgets for their proposals, analyze their investments for values across their portfolio of initiatives, and track both tangible and intangible returns over time, with a particular emphasis on information technology investments and the production of OMB-300 exhibits for the US Office of Management and Budget. The introductory document was given the significant title It's Not Just Return on Investment Anymore.

The suite of documents from the US CIO Council include the following, which are readily adapted for other countries and non-government organizations:

- FAQ (Frequently Asked Questions)
- Introduction
- How-To-Guide
- Highlights (key elements from the how-to guide, and probably the best document for initial study)

== Outline of the steps in the VMM ==
Each of the four major steps of the VMM process has tasks and outputs. The breakdown below, and the description of major value factors, is based primarily on the suite of VMM documents from the US Federal Chief Information Officers Council in 2003.

=== Develop a decision framework ===
- Tasks
  - Identify and define value structure
  - Identify and define risk structure
  - Identify and define cost structure
  - Begin documentation
- Outputs
  - Prioritized value factors
  - Defined and prioritized measures within each value factor
  - Initial risk factor inventory
  - Risk tolerance boundary
  - Tailored cost structure
  - Initial documentation of basis of estimate of cost, value and risk

Forcing the development of the decision framework, with the assignment of scores to intangibles allowing comparison to other intangibles as well as tangibles, eases the resolution of differences of perspectives between senior managers (e.g. Chief Financial Officer, Risk Manager, and the proposer of the initiative), allows changes to the scores to flow through to the rest of the process (especially the analysis of alternatives), and provides clarity of benefits to a board (before, during, and after the initiative), and clarity of priorities to people looking after more detailed aspects of the initiative. The same transparency of values apply if the proposal is developed at an enterprise level, or within a lesser organizational unit.

Major value factors (from which the value hierarchy is developed) include the following

- direct customer value: benefits to customers/clients, e.g. convenient access, product enhancement
- social: benefits to society as a whole, e.g. reducing CO_{2} emissions
- operational: better operations and lowering barriers to future initiatives, e.g. improved infrastructure
- strategic: contributions to strategic initiatives and fulfilling the mission of the organization
- financial: financial benefits, including increased revenue, decreased costs, and cost avoidance

=== Analyze alternatives ===
- Tasks
  - Identify and define alternatives
  - Estimate value and cost
  - Conduct risk analysis
  - Ongoing documentation
- Outputs
  - Viable alternatives for solutions
  - Cost and value analyses
  - Risk analyses
  - Tailored basis of estimate documenting value, cost, and risk, economic factors and assumptions

=== Pull the information together ===
- Tasks
  - Aggregate the cost estimate
  - Calculate the return on investment
  - Calculate the value score
  - Calculate the risk score
  - Compare value, cost, and risk
- Outputs
  - Cost estimate
  - ROI metrics
  - Value score
  - Risk scores (cost and value)
  - Comparison of cost, value and risk

=== Communicate and document ===
- Tasks
  - Communicate value to customers and stakeholders
  - Prepare budget justification document
  - Satisfy ad hoc reporting requirement
  - Use lessons learned to improve processes
- Outputs
  - Documentation, insight and support:
    - To develop results-based management controls
    - For enterprise budget reporting and analysis
    - To communicative initiative value
    - For improving decision making and performance measurement through "lessons learned"
  - Change and ad hoc reporting requirements

== Uses in Capital Investment Planning ==
A holistic approach to Capital Investment Planning (CIP), using the portfolio approach, requires a significant amount of supporting documentation. The VMM approach can provide planning data and performance assessment criteria for the following:

- Summary of spending
- Project description and justification
- Performance goals and measures
- Alternatives analysis
- Risk inventory and assessment
- Program management (partial)
- Acquisition strategy (partial)
- Project and funding plan (partial)
- Business case criteria (partial)

In particular, VMM allows quantitative reporting of commitments to particular intangibles across a number of initiatives, even when they differ by their stage in their lifecycles.

== Related theories ==
- Val IT – Getting value from IT investments (published by ISACA), which helps link VMM to IT governance.
- Risk management – as risks play a large part in VMM
- Enterprise architecture – as enterprise architects are central players in planning programs of work
- Value theory – as this provides a core background to understanding what people value
- Social earnings ratio - the non-financial corollary to the financial metric price earnings ratio

== See also ==
- Value networks
- Value network analysis
