= ISO 81060 =

Standards for blood pressure devices

ISO 81060 is an international series of standards specifying requirements for test methods for the clinical verification of non-invasive blood pressure monitors. The standards are developed by the International Organization for Standardization (ISO) within Technical Committee ISO/TC 121 "Anaesthetic and respiratory equipment" in the subcommittee "ISO/TC 121/SC 3/JWG 7 - Joint ISO/TC 121/SC 3-IEC/SC 62D WG: Non-invasive blood pressure monitoring equipment." This series of standards defines clinical requirements, subject selection, procedures, acceptance parameters, and labeling for the clinical verification of the accuracy of blood pressure measurements for blood pressure monitors used in medical diagnostics, monitoring, and self-monitoring. It applies to both manually operated devices and automatic measurement systems.

== Background ==
Non-invasive blood pressure measurement is a key diagnostic procedure in medicine and is used in both clinical settings and at home.

Beginning in the 1980s, several organizations independently developed their own protocols for the clinical validation of blood pressure measuring devices, including the Association for the Advancement of Medical Instrumentation (AAMI, protocols of 1987, 1992, and 2002), the British Hypertension Society (BHS, 1990 and 1993), the German Hypertension League (DHL, 1999), and the European Society of Hypertension (ESH, 2002 and 2010), alongside a first ISO protocol published in 2009. The authors of these separate protocols recognized that science, manufacturers, patients, and consumers would be better served by a single, globally accepted validation protocol, and representatives of AAMI, ESH, and ISO therefore agreed to develop such a universal standard jointly. This harmonization effort resulted in a joint ANSI/AAMI/ISO standard in 2013 and, subsequently, in ISO 81060-2:2018, which is regarded as superseding the earlier national and regional protocols.

The series establishes common requirements for clinical verification studies, enabling manufacturers and testing laboratories to use standardized procedures.

== Scope ==
This series of standards specifies requirements for:

- manual blood pressure monitors (e.g., aneroid or mercury devices),
- automated cuff-based blood pressure monitors,
- point-of-care monitoring devices with a blood pressure module,
- devices intended for self-measurement,

== Parts of the series of standards ==
=== Requirements and test methods for non-automated measurement type ===
ISO 81060-1 specifies requirements and test methods for non-electrical blood pressure measuring devices that rely on the operator's observations. These include mechanical pressure measurement systems with a cuff, hand pump, and readout technology. Key areas:

- mechanical safety
- pressure accuracy
- leak tests
- requirements for cuffs and tubing

=== Clinical investigation of intermittent automated measurement type ===
ISO 81060-2 specifies the requirements for the clinical verification of automatic blood pressure monitors for intermittent blood pressure measurement using a cuff, such as oscillometric devices. The technical basis for this part was agreed jointly by representatives of AAMI, ESH, and ISO in a 2018 collaboration statement that set out the core elements of a single, globally applicable validation procedure.

Key aspects:

- Specification of reference measurement methods
- Requirements for subject selection
- Specification of test procedures
- Requirements for the evaluation of test procedures
- Definition of acceptance criteria
- Requirements for the presentation of results

Furthermore, specific subject groups are defined.

=== Clinical investigation of continuous automated measurement type ===
Earlier validation approaches for wearable or continuous blood pressure devices, such as standards first published by the Institute of Electrical and Electronics Engineers (IEEE) in 2014 and amended in 2019, relied on manual auscultatory measurement as the reference method, which was considered adequate for intermittent but not for continuous measurement. ISO 81060-1 and ISO 81060-2 addressing only cuff-based devices. Therefore ISO 81060-3 was developed to close this gap for continuous, automated, non-invasive blood pressure measurement.

Unlike ISO 81060-2, this part covers devices capable of determining blood pressure values continuously, i.e., in principle, for every heartbeat, without necessarily employing a cuff. Analogous to Part 2, reference methods, subject selection, test procedures, their evaluation and presentation, and acceptance criteria are specified.

=== Requirements for the repeatability and reproducibility of NIBP simulators for testing of automated non-invasive sphygmomanometers ===
ISO 81060-5 specifies requirements for the repeatability and reproducibility of non-invasive blood pressure simulators intended to test automated sphygmomanometers utilizing the oscillometric non-continuous method only.

== Standard parts under preparation ==
Additional standard parts in the series are currently being developed within the ISO committee. These include:

- ISO/TS 81060-4 Non-invasive sphygmomanometers - Part 4: Requirements for devices intended for use during patient transport

is currently in the drafting phase. The standard is listed, for example, on the BSI's public project pages, but has not yet been published by ISO itself.

- ISO/CD 81060-7 Non-invasive sphygmomanometers - Part 7: Clinical performance verification of intermittent or repeated intermittent cuffless measurement type

These standards are currently in the draft stage and have not yet been published; consequently, details regarding their content are not publicly available. They are intended to expand the series to include additional areas of application or specific types of equipment.

== Examples of practical significance ==
Manufacturers of medical devices must comply with the requirements of this series of standards during development and conformity assessment.

Despite the availability of standardized validation protocols, most blood pressure measuring devices sold globally have not been clinically validated against them. Therefore a stronger regulatory oversight to ensure that only validated devices reach the market is needed.

ISO 81060-2 is not listed as a harmonised standard under the EU Medical Devices Regulation (MDR) and therefore does not automatically confer a presumption of conformity. Like other non-harmonised international standards, it falls instead under the MDR's more general requirement to take into account the "generally acknowledged state of the art", which manufacturers must address individually in their technical documentation.

Organizations such as the German Hypertension League refer to DIN EN ISO 81060-2 when awarding seals of approval.
