= Sentilo Platform =

Sentilo
- Developer(s): OpenTrends
- Repository: github.com/sentilo/sentilo
- Type: Framework
- Website: www.sentilo.io

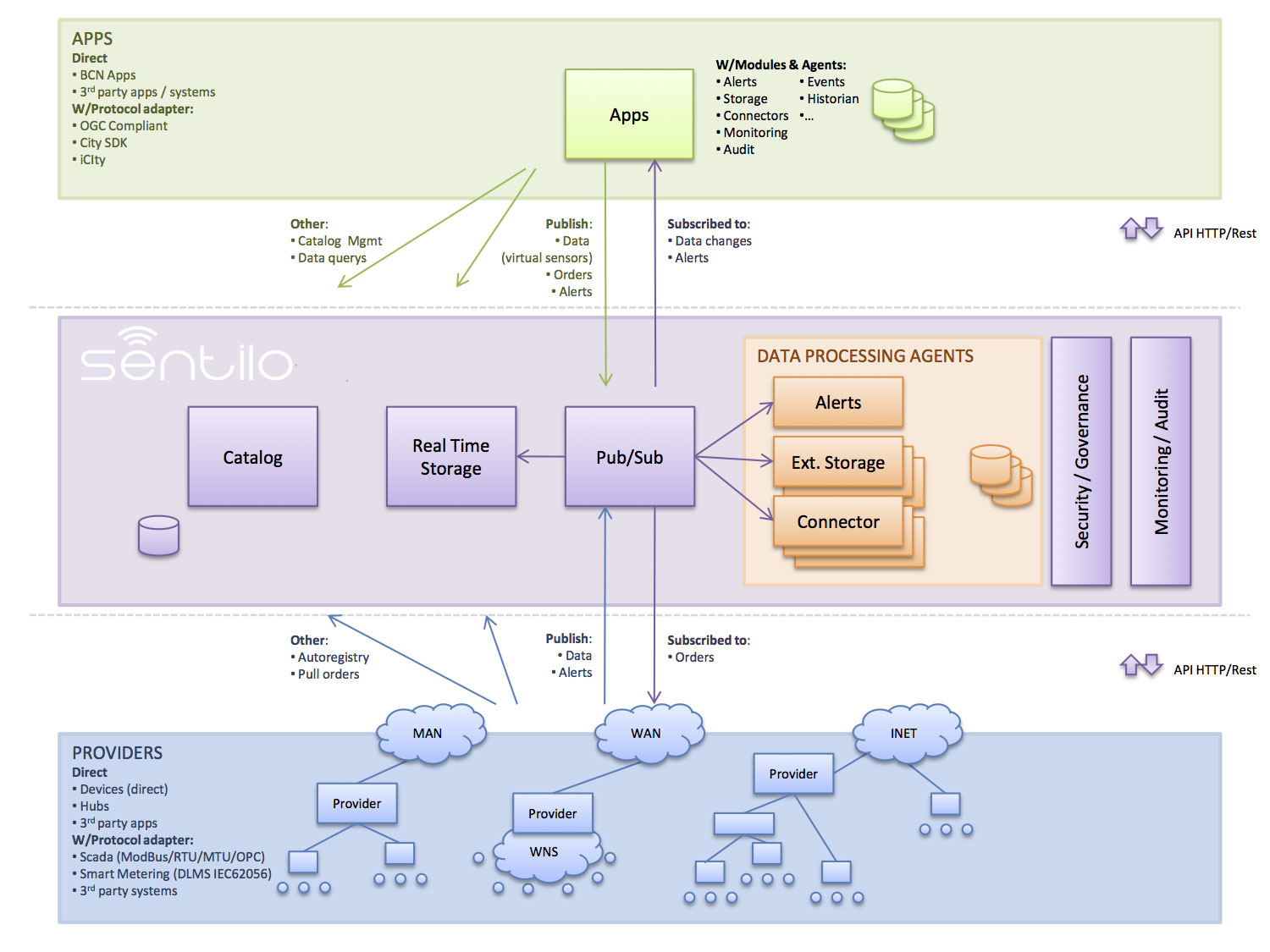
Sentilo architecture

Sentilo (“Sensor” in Esperanto) is an open-source software sensor and actuator project.

== Description ==
Sentilo is designed to be cross-platform with the objective of sharing information between heterogeneous systems and to easily integrate legacy applications. Sentilo was started in November 2012 by the Barcelona City Council, through the Municipal Institute of Informatics (IMI), for its smart city project called City OS. Since then, the city of Terrassa joined the project, as well as the Cellnex Telecom.

Sentilo could be used for other Internet of things applications. Cisco Systems promoted the CityOS project and Sentilo in 2014. Also in 2014, Spanish company Libelium announced they would use it with their sensors. In 2016, some initial tests were discussed. It can be on-premises software or a platform as a service using cloud computing from OpenTrends called Thingtia, announced in January 2017.

Sentilo can be downloaded direct from the web or viewed in GitHub. Data such as the number of sensors and transaction rate are available at a web site.
