= Asset Description Metadata Schema =

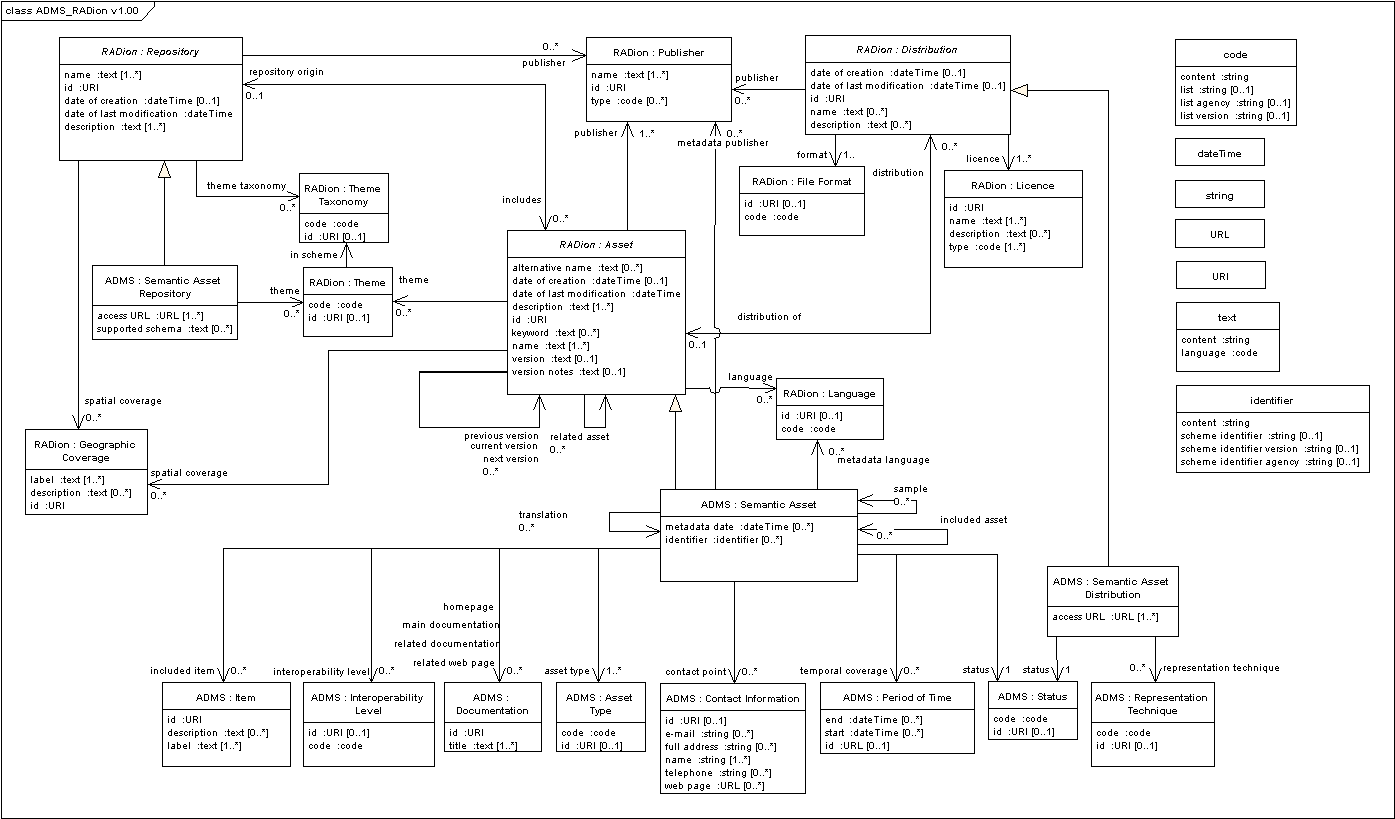
ADMS UML model version 1.00

The Asset Description Metadata Schema (ADMS) is a common metadata vocabulary to describe standards, so-called interoperability assets, on the Web.

Used in concert with web syndication technology ADMS helps people make sense of the complex multi-publisher environment around standards and in particular the ones which are semantic assets such as ontologies, data models, data dictionaries, code lists, XML and RDF schemas. In spite of their importance, standards are not easily discoverable on the web via search engines because metadata about them is seldom available. Navigating on the websites of the different publishers of standards is not efficient either.

== Key terminology ==
A semantic asset is a specific type of standard which involves:

highly reusable metadata
(e.g. xml schemata, generic data models)
and/or reference data
(e.g. code lists, taxonomies, dictionaries, vocabularies)

Organisations use semantic assets to share information and knowledge (within themselves and with others). Semantic assets are usually very valuable and reusable elements for the development of Information Systems, in particular, as part of machine-to-machine interfaces. As enablers to interoperable information exchange, semantic assets are usually created, published and maintained by standardisation bodies. Nonetheless, ICT projects and groups of experts also create such assets. There are therefore many publishers of semantic assets with different degrees of formalism.

== What is ADMS ==
ADMS is a standardised metadata vocabulary created by the EU's Interoperability Solutions for European Public Administrations (ISA) Programme of the European Commission to help publishers of standards document what their standards are about (their name, their status, theme, version, etc.) and where they can be found on the Web. ADMS descriptions can then be published on different websites while the standard itself remains on the website of its publisher (i.e. syndication of content). ADMS embraces the multi-publisher environment and, at the same time, it provides the means for the creation of aggregated catalogues of standards and single points of access to them based on ADMS descriptions. The Commission will offer a single point of access to standards described using ADMS via its collaborative platform, Joinup. The Federation service will increase the visibility of standards described with ADMS on the web. This will also stimulate their reuse by Pan-European initiatives.

== ADMS Working Group ==
More than 43 people of 20 EU Member States as well as from the US and Australia have participated in the ADMS Working Group. Most of them were experts from standardisation bodies, research centres and the EU Commission. The working group used a methodology based on W3C’s processes and methods.

== How to download ADMS ==
ADMS version 1 was officially released in April 2012. Version 1.00 of ADMS is available for download on Joinup: https://web.archive.org/web/20120430065401/http://joinup.ec.europa.eu/asset/adms/release/100

ADMS is offered under ISA's Open Metadata Licence v1.1

== Related work ==
The ADMS specification reuses existing metadata vocabularies and core vocabularies including:

- The Dublin Core Metadata Element Set (DCMES)
- The Data Catalog Vocabulary (DCAT)
- The Friend of a Friend (FOAF) Ontology
- The vCard Ontology

== The future of ADMS ==
ADMS v1.00 will be contributed to W3C’s Government Linked Data (GLD) Working Group. This means that ADMS will be published by the GLD Working Group as First Public Working Drafts for further consultation within the context of the typical W3C standardization process. The desired outcome of that process will be the publication of ADMS as a W3C Recommendation available under W3C's Royalty-Free License.

The ADMS RDFS Vocabulary already has a w3.org namespace: http://www.w3.org/ns/adms#.
