= Data governance =

Capability that enables an organization to ensure high data quality

Data governance or governance of data is a system consisting of guidelines, policies, standards, procedures, and practices that determine the creation, management and re-use of data. Data governance is used on multiple levels - the international, national and organizational. On the international level, it forms international relations and Internet governance, and is referred to as global or international data governance. On the national level, national data governance "is a system of decision rights and accountabilities for the management of the availability, usability, integrity and security of data" On the organisational level, governance of data is a concept within data management and is a part of corporate or organizational governance.

Data governance involves delegating authority over data and exercising that authority through decision-making processes. It plays a role in enhancing the value of data assets.

== International level ==
International data governance or global data governance involves regulating cross-border data flows among countries. This field was first formed in the early 2000s, and consists of norms, principles and rules governing various types of data.

There have been several international groups established by research organizations that aim to grant access to their data. These groups that enable an exchange of data are, as a result, exposed to domestic and international legal interpretations that ultimately decide how data is used. However, as of 2023, there are no international laws or agreements specifically focused on data protection.

== Organizational data governance within data management ==
Data governance definition
Definition	Source	Context
"system by which current and future data is collected, stored, secured, protected or controlled by IT systems, and impacts the management processes and decisions relating to data"		Information technology
"process focused on managing the quality, consistency, usability, security, and availability of data"		Information security and protection
"system by which the current and future use of data is governed"		AI
"development and enforcement of policies related to the management of data"		Big data

Data governance is the set of principles, policies, and processes that guide the effective and responsible use of data within an organization. It creates a framework for decision making, accountability, and oversight across the data lifecycle, from creation and storage to sharing and disposal.

Data governance is closely linked with data management, which provides the practical methods to carry out governance objectives. These methods include data quality assurance, metadata management, master data management, security controls, and compliance monitoring.

Together, governance and management aim to maximize the value of data as a strategic asset, reduce risks from misuse or inaccuracy, and ensure compliance with regulatory, ethical, and business requirements. The importance of this discipline has grown with the rise of big data, cloud computing, and artificial intelligence, where consistent standards and stewardship are essential for privacy protection, interoperability, and informed decision making.

Researchers Vijay Khatri and Carol V. Brown differentiate between data governance and data management, defining governance as "what decisions must be made to ensure effective management and use of IT (decision domains) and who makes the decisions (locus of accountability for decision-making)", and management as "making and implementing decisions". In 2010, they published a data governance framework based on five components: data principles (which define the data's purpose by an organization), data quality, metadata, data access, and data lifecycle.

In 2017, the ISO released a framework for data governance, ISO/IEC 38505-1:2017.

Due to the increased use of large language models and the datasets used to train them, a 2022 paper proposed a data governance framework in the context of human rights.

In 2026, a research team led by Lydia Jennings published a framework for Indigenous data governance, Guidelines for the Governance of Indigenous Peoples' Data in Scholarly Publishing, based on the CARE Principles for Indigenous Data Governance.

As of May 2026, the National Institute of Standards and Technology is developing the Data Governance and Management Profile, which is meant to be an integration of its Privacy Framework, Cybersecurity Framework, and AI Risk Management Framework.

Other well-known data governance frameworks include ISO 8000, the CMMI Data Management Maturity (DMM) Model, and DAMA-DMBOK.

== Data governance drivers ==
While data governance initiatives can be driven by a desire to improve data quality, they are often driven by C-level leaders responding to external regulations. In a 2017 report conducted by the CIO WaterCooler community, 54% stated the key driver was efficiencies in processes; 39% - regulatory requirements; and only 7% customer service. Examples of these regulations include Sarbanes–Oxley Act, Basel I, Basel II, HIPAA, GDPR, cGMP, and a number of data privacy regulations. To achieve compliance with these regulations, business processes and controls require formal management processes to govern the data subject to these regulations. Successful programs identify drivers that are meaningful to both supervisory and executive leadership.

Common themes among the external regulations center on the need to manage risk. The risks can be financial misstatement, inadvertent release of sensitive data, or poor data quality for key decisions. Methods to manage these risks vary from industry to industry. Examples of commonly referenced best practices and guidelines include COBIT, ISO/IEC 38500, and others.

Regulations important for data governance include information privacy laws such as the General Data Protection Regulation (GDPR) in the European Union and the Health Insurance Portability and Accountability Act (HIPAA) in the United States; data localization laws; and freedom of information laws. Other notable regulations include the Data Protection Directive, the Data Governance Act, the California Consumer Privacy Act, and BCBS 239.

== Data governance initiatives (Dimensions) ==
Data governance initiatives improve the quality of data by assigning a team responsible for data's accuracy, completeness, consistency, timeliness, validity, and uniqueness. This team usually consists of executive leadership, project management, line-of-business managers, and data stewards. The team usually employs a methodology for tracking and improving enterprise data, such as Six Sigma, and tools for data mapping, profiling, cleansing, and monitoring data.

Data governance initiatives may be aimed at achieving a number of objectives including offering better visibility to internal and external customers (such as supply chain management), compliance with regulatory law, improving operations after rapid company growth or corporate mergers, or to aid the efficiency of enterprise knowledge workers by reducing confusion and error and increasing their scope of knowledge. Many data governance initiatives are also inspired by past attempts to fix information quality at the departmental level, which can lead to incongruent and redundant data quality processes. Most large companies have many applications and databases that cannot easily share information. Therefore, knowledge workers within large organizations may not have access to the data they need to do their jobs effectively. When they do have access to the data, the data quality may be poor. By setting up a data governance practice or corporate data authority (individual or area responsible for determining how to proceed, in the best interest of the business, when a data issue arises), these problems can be mitigated.

== Implementation ==
Implementation of a data governance initiative may vary in scope as well as origin. Sometimes, an executive mandate will arise to initiate an enterprise-wide effort. Sometimes the mandate will be to create a pilot project or projects, limited in scope and objectives, aimed at either resolving existing issues or demonstrating value. Sometimes, an initiative originates from lower down in the organization's hierarchy and will be deployed in a limited scope to demonstrate value to potential sponsors higher up in the organization. The initial scope of an implementation can vary greatly as well, from review of a one-off IT system to a cross-organization initiative.

Several concepts are recommended for organizations to consider in their data governance implementation strategy: a data lake for storing their data; data lineage for tracing the history and location of their data; policies for ensuring data security; data redundancy for protecting against data loss; Data federation for merging data from multiple sources into one view; guidelines for protecting data quality; data consistency; and data availability.

The types of data that organizations can be responsible for include master data, reference data, and/or metadata.

An organization may have a single data governance policy or multiple policies over areas such as data integrity, data access, data privacy and usage, data sharing, and data retention.

There are different levels of roles and responsibilities in data governance. Notable roles include the chief data officer, who leads the data governance of the organization; the data protection officer, who is responsible for data privacy and security; and the data steward, who translates between business requirements and technical specifications.

In the context of healthcare, the American Health Information Management Association provides several recommendations for data governance programs: defining data governance and its scope; stating priorities of the data governance program; establishing accountability through specific roles and responsibilities; defining performance indicators; and encouraging collaboration.

Data governance maturity models grade an organization on how well it has implemented and proactively improved upon data governance policies, set clear roles, and uses data to make decisions.

== Data governance tools ==
Leaders of successful data governance programs declared at the Data Governance Conference in Orlando, FL, in December 2006, that data governance is about 80 to 95 percent communication. That stated, it is a given that many of the objectives of a data governance program must be accomplished with appropriate tools. Many vendors are now positioning their products as data governance tools. Due to the different focus areas of various data governance initiatives, a given tool may or may not be appropriate. Additionally, many tools that are not marketed as governance tools address governance needs and demands.

== See also ==
- Asset Description Metadata Schema
- Basel II – Banking regulation framework
- Business semantics management
- COBIT – IT management framework by ISACA
- Corporate governance of information technology – Subset discipline of corporate governance
- Data Act (European Union)
- Data breach notification laws
- Data Governance Act (European Union)
- Data Protection Directive (EU)
- Data sovereignty – Concept in law and ethics
- Health Insurance Portability and Accountability Act – United States federal law concerning health information
- Information architecture – Structural design of shared information
- Information governance – Information management system
- Information security regulations
- Information technology controls
- ISO/IEC 38500 – Standard for corporate governance of information technology
- ISO/TC 215
- List of datasets for machine-learning research
- Master data management – Practice for controlling corporate data
- Operational risk management – Exercising systematic anticipatory thinking skills
- Sarbanes–Oxley Act – 2002 U.S. law regarding corporate accounting
- Semantics of Business Vocabulary and Business Rules – Standard of Object Management Group
- Simulation governance
- Universal Data Element Framework – (UDEF) A framework for categorizing, naming, and indexing data, see new framework: ODEF
