= ISO 42500 =

ISO 42500 "Sharing economy - General principles" is an international standard issued by the International Organization for Standardization that identifies the general principles to be used by all types and sizes of organization in a sharing economy (e.g. commercial enterprises, government agencies, not-for-profit organizations).

Organizations that choose to use ISO 42500 as a reference for general principles can help improve information and transparency towards their customers.

ISO 42500 was published for the first time in November 2021 by the Committee ISO/TC 324.

== Main requirements of the standard ==
ISO 42500: 2021 is structured according to the following chapters:

- 1 Scope
- 2 Normative references
- 3 Terms and definitions
- 4 Guiding principles
- 4.1 General
- 4.2 Integrity
- 4.3 Transparency
- 4.4 Accountability and authorization
- 4.5 Accessibility and inclusion
- 4.6 Respect for other affected interests
- 4.7 Competence
- Annex A Figure representing the sharing economy
- Bibliography

== History ==
Year	Description
2021	ISO 42500 (1st Edition)

== See also ==
- Quality management system
- List of ISO standards
- Conformity assessment
- International Organization for Standardization
