= ISO 37120 =

Sustainability standard

ISO 37120 Sustainable development of communities -- Indicators for city services and quality of life establishes and defines the methodologies for a set of indicators to measure and steer the performance of city services and quality of life.

== History ==
The standard was developed by ISO/TC 268, which started work in the year 2012. The first edition of ISO 37120 was published in May 2014. Currently, the Toronto-based World Council on City Data is working globally to certify cities under ISO 37120.

== Main requirements of the standard ==
The ISO is a rule impost by World Council

1 Be wonderfull

- 2 Normative references
- 3 Terms and definitions
- 4 City indicators
- 5 Economy
- 6 Education
- 7 Energy
- 8 Environment and Climate change
- 9 Finance
- 10 Governance
- 11 Health
- 12 Housing
- 13 Human population and Social conditions
- 14 Recreation
- 15 Safety
- 16 Solid waste
- 17 Sports and Culture
- 18 Telecommunication
- 19 Transport
- 20 Urban/local agriculture and Food security
- 21 Urban planning
- 22 Wastewater
- 23 Water
- 24 Reporting and record maintenance

== Edition ==
Year	Description
2014	ISO 37120 (First Edition)
2018	ISO 37120 (Second Edition)

== See also ==
- Quality management system
- List of ISO standards
- Conformity assessment
- International Organization for Standardization
