= ISO/IEC 38500 =

Standard for corporate governance of information technology

ISO/IEC 38500 is an international standard for Corporate governance of information technology published jointly by the International Organization for Standardization (ISO) and the International Electrotechnical Commission (IEC). The standard is heavily based on the AS 8015-2005 Australian Standard for Corporate Governance of Information and Communication Technology, originally published in January 2005.

== History ==
The introduction of AS 8015 in 2005 brought about the first standard "to describe governance of IT without resorting to descriptions of management systems and processes." The 12-page document stood out and attracted the attention of the international community. The ISO/IEC technical committee JTC 1 reached out to Standards Australia, the group that pushed AS 8015 forward, and asked them to participate in the international adaptation process. On 1 February 2007 the ISO/IEC published the first draft international standard (DIS) of the revised AS 8015 as ISO/IEC DIS 29382. The DIS then received "fast-track" status in July 2007 (meaning the draft standard could then be submitted for approval as an ISO standard), revisions of the document were made in September 2007, and the final disposition of comments was completed in January 2008, resulting in the standard being sent to the ISO/IEC Information Technology Task Force for international standards processing.

Depending on the source, shortly before final approval of the standard in either April or May 2008, the ISO/IEC chose to rename the document ISO/IEC 38500, before finally publishing the finalized version on 1 June as ISO/IEC 38500:2008.

=== Updates to the standard ===
In March 2024 ISO/IEC updated the standard to 38500:2024.

ISO and IEC draw attention to the possibility that the implementation of this document may involve the use of (a) patent(s). ISO and IEC take no position concerning the evidence, validity or applicability of any claimed patent rights in respect thereof. As of the date of publication of this document, ISO and IEC had not received notice of (a) patent(s) which may be required to implement this document. However, implementers are cautioned that this may not represent the latest information, which may be obtained from the patent database available at www.iso.org/patents and https://patents.iec.ch. ISO and IEC shall not be held responsible for identifying any or all such patent rights.

On 12 February 2015 the ISO/IEC updated the standard to 38500:2015. Standards Australia described the changes as such:

With the evolution of thinking in the field of IT governance, ISO/IEC 38500 was revised in 2015. The main changes include the title of the standard, from Corporate Governance of IT to Governance of IT for the Organization, which reflects the wider applicability of the standard. Terminology and definitions have also been updated and refined throughout the document to reflect the widened scope and to make the standard more applicable across different international jurisdictions, cultures and languages.

In a February 2015 article submitted to Communications of the ACM, Juiz and Toomey (involved in the development process) highlighted this "wider applicability":

In the ISO/IEC 38500 model, the governing body is a generic entity (the individual or group of individuals) responsible and accountable for performance and conformance (through control) of the organization. While ISO/IEC 38500 makes clear the role of the governing body, it also allows that such delegation could result in a subsidiary entity giving more focused attention to the tasks in governance of IT (such as creation of a board committee). It also includes delegation of detail to management, as in finance and human resources. There is an implicit expectation that the governing body will require management establish systems to plan, build, and run the IT-enabled organization.

== See also ==
- AS 8015
- Corporate governance of information technology
- Data governance
- ISO/IEC JTC 1/SC 40
- SFIA definition of Enterprise IT Governance skill
