= Risk Management Framework =

US federal government guideline

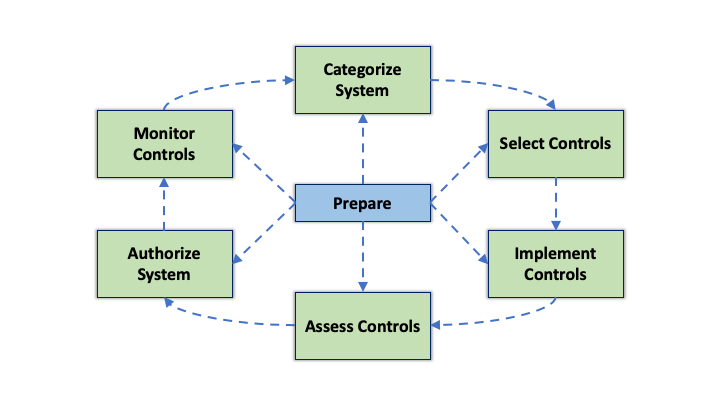
RMF 7 step process

The Risk Management Framework (RMF) is a United States federal government guideline, standard, and process for managing risk to help secure information systems (computers and networks). The RMF was developed by the National Institute of Standards and Technology (NIST), and provides a structured process that integrates information security, privacy, and risk management activities into the system development life cycle. The RMF is an important aspect of a system's attainment of its Authority to Operate (ATO).

== Overview ==
The primary document outlining the RMF is NIST Special Publication 800-37. The RMF steps link to several other NIST standards and guidelines, including NIST Special Publication 800-53.

The RMF process includes the following steps:

- Prepare to execute the RMF by establishing a context and setting priorities for managing security and privacy risk at both organizational and system levels.
- Categorize the information system and the data it processes, stores, and transmits, based on an impact analysis.
- Select a baseline set of security controls for the information system based on its security categorization. Tailor and supplement the baseline controls as needed, based on an organizational risk assessment and specific local conditions. If applicable, overlays are added in this step.
- Implement the security controls identified in the previous step.
- Assess: A third-party assessor evaluates whether the controls are properly implemented and effective.
- Authorize: Based on the assessment results, the system is either granted or denied an Authorization to Operate (ATO). If certain issues remain unresolved, the ATO may be postponed. Typically, ATOs are granted for up to three years, after which the process must be repeated.
- Monitor the security controls continuously to ensure ongoing effectiveness as outlined earlier in the process.

== History ==
The Federal Information Security Management Act of 2002 (FISMA 2002) was enacted to safeguard U.S. economic and national security through improved information security.

Congress later passed the Federal Information Security Modernization Act of 2014 (FISMA 2014) to enhance the original legislation by granting the Department of Homeland Security (DHS) greater authority over federal information security and defining the Office of Management and Budget's (OMB) duties in managing federal agency information security practices.

FISMA mandates the protection of information and information systems against unauthorized access, use, disclosure, disruption, modification, or destruction, ensuring confidentiality, integrity, and availability. Title III of FISMA 2002 tasked NIST with developing information security and risk management standards, guidelines, and requirements.

The RMF, outlined in NIST Special Publication 800-37 and first published in February 2010, is designed to help organizations manage cybersecurity risks and comply with various U.S. laws and regulations, including the Federal Information Security Modernization Act of 2014, the Privacy Act of 1974, and Federal Information Processing Standards, among others. In December 2019, revision 2 of the NIST Special Publication 800-37 was published, introducing a Prepare step to the overall process.

== Risks ==
Throughout its lifecycle, an information system will face various types of risk that can impact its security posture. The RMF process aids in the early identification and resolution of these risks. Broadly, risks can be classified as infrastructure, project, application, information asset, business continuity, outsourcing, external, and strategic risks. Infrastructure risks pertain to the reliability of computers and networks, while project risks involve budgeting, timelines, and system quality. Application risks relate to system performance and capacity. Information asset risks concern the potential loss or unauthorized disclosure of data. Business continuity risks focus on maintaining system reliability and uptime. Outsourcing risks involve the impact of third-party service providers on the system.

External risks are factors beyond the information system's control that can impact the system's security. Strategic risks are associated with the need for information system functions to align with the business strategy that the system supports.

== Revision 2 updates ==
The key objectives for the update to RMF Revision 2 included the following:

- Improve communication between risk management activities at the executive (C-suite) level and those at the system and operational levels;
- Institutionalize critical risk management preparatory activities at all levels to facilitate more effective and cost-efficient RMF execution;
- Demonstrate how the NIST Cybersecurity Framework can be aligned with the RMF and implemented through established NIST risk management processes;
- Integrate privacy risk management into the RMF to better address privacy protection responsibilities;
- Promote the development of trustworthy, secure software and systems by aligning system engineering processes in NIST SP 800-160 Volume 1, with relevant tasks in the RMF;
- Incorporate security-related supply chain risk management (SCRM) concepts into the RMF, addressing risks such as counterfeit components, tampering, malicious code insertion, and poor manufacturing practices across the system development life cycle (SDLC); and
- Allow for an organization-generated control selection approach to complement the traditional baseline control selection approach, supporting the use of the consolidated control catalog in NIST SP 800-53 Revision 5.

Revision 2 also introduced a new "Prepare" step (step 0) to enhance the effectiveness, efficiency, and cost-effectiveness of the security and privacy risk management processes.

== See also ==
- Department of Defense Information Assurance Certification and Accreditation Process (DIACAP) - predecessor to RMF
- Zero Trust Architecture
- NIST Cybersecurity Framework
- Cyber Risk Quantification
- Outline of computer security
