= Cyber Intelligence House =

Singapore cyber intelligence company

- Founder: Mikko S. Niemelä
- Headquarters: Singapore
- Website: cyberintelligencehouse.com
- Formerly called: Kinkayo

Cyber Intelligence House, formerly known as Kinkayo, is a Singapore based cyber intelligence agency specializing in cyber exposure. The company detects and monitors cyber exposure via dark web, deep web and data breaches alerting individuals and businesses about potential cyber threats.

== Products ==
The Cyber Exposure Index (CEI), the company's research-driven project, is a proprietary global scoring system that calculates the exposure index of listed companies.

Scores are based on exposed credentials, hacker-group activity, and leaked sensitive information. CEI is a cyber risk score given to public companies listed on stock exchanges hosted in 11 countries (Australia, Finland, Germany, Hong Kong, Indonesia, Italy, South Africa, UK, US, Malaysia, and Singapore). The CEI scores around 6,000 listed companies on their levels of exposure, after analyzing data collected on each company from publicly available sources in the dark web and deep web, and published data breaches. Evaluated companies are given a score ranging from 0 to 300+, with 0 indicating no exposure over the past 12 months and 300+ indicating that the company is among the top 10% most exposed companies globally.

The index was first launched in October 2017. The results concluded that publicly listed companies in Australia, Hong Kong and Singapore were the least exposed to cyber threats. In October 2018, the results were updated and Singapore, Malaysia and Indonesia were earmarked as the least exposed countries. This has led to some speculation that cyber threat exposure is very location-centric, as Asia Pacific firms tend to have lower exposure than their American or EU counterparts.

Hacked is a cyber exposure monitoring app for individuals, launched in June 2018. It is available on Android, and provides free email account monitoring plus additional paid monitoring options.

== Controversies ==
The CEI faced some negative press in South Africa, when it was ranked as the third most exposed country in October 2017. The South African Banking Risk Information Center (SABRIC) speculated that the research findings might cause unnecessary fear, uncertainty, and doubt.
