= Sentek Global =

Systems engineering and cybersecurity firm

- Company type: Private
- Industry: Defense
- Founded: San Diego, California, U.S. (2001)
- Headquarters: San Diego, California, U.S.
- Key people: Eric Basu (CEO)
- Services: Information Assurance; Risk Management Framework
- Website: sentekglobal.com

Sentek Global is a consulting firm specializing in systems engineering and cybersecurity. The company's offerings are primarily related to IT security program management, but also include NIST Risk Management Framework and leadership training.

== History ==
Sentek Global was founded in 2001 by Eric Basu, a reserve US Navy SEAL officer.

In 2011, Sentek was awarded a $70-million, 5-year contract from the U.S. Navy's Space and Naval Warfare Systems Command to provide information assurance, systems engineering, and other services related to software and implementation.

In 2021, Sentek Global was acquired by Deloitte.
