= Federal Information Security Management Act of 2002 =

United States federal law

- Long title: An Act to strengthen Federal Government information security, including through the requirement for the development of mandatory information security risk management standards.
- Acronyms (colloquial): FISMA
- Nicknames: E-Government Act of 2002
- Enacted by: the 107th United States Congress
- Effective: December 17, 2002

Citations
- Public law: 107-347
- Statutes at Large: 116 Stat. 2899 aka 116 Stat. 2946

Codification
- Titles amended: 40 U.S.C.: Public Buildings, Property, And Works; 44 U.S.C.: Public Printing and Documents
- U.S.C. sections created: 44 U.S.C. ch. 35, subch. III § 3541 et seq.
- U.S.C. sections amended: 40 U.S.C. ch. 113, subch. III § 11331; 40 U.S.C. ch. 113, subch. III § 11332; 44 U.S.C. ch. 1 § 101; 44 U.S.C. ch. 35, subch. I § 3501 et seq.

Legislative history
- Introduced in the House as H.R. 3844 by Thomas M. Davis (R–VA) on March 5, 2002; Committee consideration by House Government Reform, House Science; Passed the House on November 15, 2002 (passed without objection); Passed the Senate on November 15, 2002 (passed unanimous consent); Signed into law by President George W. Bush on December 17, 2002

Major amendments
- Replaced by the Federal Information Security Modernization Act of 2014

The Federal Information Security Management Act of 2002 (FISMA, 44 U.S.C. § 3541, et seq.) is a United States federal law enacted in 2002 as Title III of the E-Government Act of 2002 (Pub. L. 107–347 (text) (PDF), 116 Stat. 2899). The act recognized the importance of information security to the economic and national security interests of the United States. The act requires each federal agency to develop, document, and implement an agency-wide program to provide information security for the information and information systems that support the operations and assets of the agency, including those provided or managed by another agency, contractor, or other source.

FISMA has brought attention within the federal government to cybersecurity and explicitly emphasized a "risk-based policy for cost-effective security." FISMA requires agency program officials, chief information officers, and inspectors general (IGs) to conduct annual reviews of the agency's information security program and report the results to the Office of Management and Budget (OMB). OMB uses this data to assist in its oversight responsibilities and to prepare this annual report to Congress on agency compliance with the act. In FY 2008, federal agencies spent $6.2 billion securing the government's total information technology investment of approximately $68 billion or about 9.2 percent of the total information technology portfolio. This law has been amended by the Federal Information Security Modernization Act of 2014 (Pub. L. 113–283 (text) (PDF)), sometimes known as FISMA2014 or FISMA Reform. FISMA2014 struck subchapters II and III of chapter 35 of title 44, United States Code, amending it with the text of the new law in a new subchapter II (44 U.S.C. § 3551).

== Purpose of the act ==
FISMA assigns specific responsibilities to federal agencies, the National Institute of Standards and Technology (NIST), and the Office of Management and Budget (OMB) in order to strengthen information security systems. In particular, FISMA requires the head of each agency to implement policies and procedures to cost-effectively reduce information technology security risks to an acceptable level.

According to FISMA, the term information security means protecting information and information systems from unauthorized access, use, disclosure, disruption, modification, or destruction to provide integrity, confidentiality, and availability.

== Implementation of FISMA ==
Per FISMA, NIST is responsible for developing standards, guidelines, and associated methods and techniques for providing adequate information security for all agency operations and assets, excluding national security systems. NIST works closely with federal agencies to improve their understanding and implementation of FISMA to protect their information and information systems and publishes standards and guidelines that provide the foundation for strong information security programs at agencies. NIST performs its statutory responsibilities through the Computer Security Division of the Information Technology Laboratory. NIST develops standards, metrics, tests, and validation programs to promote, measure, and validate the security in information systems and services. NIST hosts the following:

- FISMA implementation project
- Information Security Automation Program (ISAP)
- National Vulnerability Database (NVD) – the U.S. government content repository for ISAP and Security Content Automation Protocol (SCAP). NVD is the U.S. government repository of standards-based vulnerability management data. This data enables automation of vulnerability management, security measurement, and compliance (e.g., FISMA)

== Compliance framework defined by FISMA and supporting standards ==
FISMA defines a framework for managing information security that must be followed for all information systems used or operated by a U.S. federal government agency in the executive or legislative branches, or by a contractor or other organization on behalf of a federal agency in those branches. This framework is further defined by the standards and guidelines developed by NIST.

=== Inventory of information systems ===
FISMA requires that agencies have an information systems inventory in place. According to FISMA, the head of each agency shall develop and maintain an inventory of major information systems (including major national security systems) operated by or under the control of such agency The identification of information systems in an inventory under this subsection shall include an identification of the interfaces between each such system and all other systems or networks, including those not operated by or under the control of the agency. The first step is to determine what constitutes the "information system" in question. There is no direct mapping of computers to an information system; rather, an information system may be a collection of individual computers put to a common purpose and managed by the same system owner. NIST SP 800-18, Revision 1, Guide for Developing Security Plans for Federal Information Systems provides guidance on determining system boundaries.

=== Categorize information and information systems according to risk level ===
All information and information systems should be categorized based on the objectives of providing appropriate levels of information security according to a range of risk levels The first mandatory security standard required by the FISMA legislation, FIPS 199 "Standards for Security Categorization of Federal Information and Information Systems" provides the definitions of security categories. The guidelines are provided by NIST SP 800-60 "Guide for Mapping Types of Information and Information Systems to Security Categories."

The overall FIPS 199 system categorization is the "high water mark" for the impact rating of any of the criteria for information types resident in a system. For example, if one information type in the system has a rating of "Low" for "confidentiality," "integrity," and "availability," and another type has a rating of "Low" for "confidentiality" and "availability" but a rating of "Moderate" for "integrity," then the impact level for "integrity" also becomes "Moderate".

=== Security controls ===
Federal information systems must meet the minimum security requirements. These requirements are defined in the second mandatory security standard required by the FISMA legislation, FIPS 200 "Minimum Security Requirements for Federal Information and Information Systems". Organizations must meet the minimum security requirements by selecting the appropriate security controls and assurance requirements as described in NIST Special Publication 800-53, "Recommended Security Controls for Federal Information Systems". The process of selecting the appropriate security controls and assurance requirements for organizational information systems to achieve adequate security is a multifaceted, risk-based activity involving management and operational personnel within the organization. Agencies have flexibility in applying the baseline security controls in accordance with the tailoring guidance provided in Special Publication 800-53. This allows agencies to adjust the security controls to more closely fit their mission requirements and operational environments. The controls selected or planned must be documented in the System Security Plan.

=== Risk assessment ===
The combination of FIPS 200 and NIST Special Publication 800-53 requires a foundational level of security for all federal information and information systems. The agency's risk assessment validates the security control set and determines if any additional controls are needed to protect agency operations (including mission, functions, image, or reputation), agency assets, individuals, other organizations, or the Nation. The resulting set of security controls establishes a level of "security due diligence" for the federal agency and its contractors. A risk assessment starts by identifying potential threats and vulnerabilities and mapping implemented controls to individual vulnerabilities. One then determines risk by calculating the likelihood and impact that any given vulnerability could be exploited, taking into account existing controls. The culmination of the risk assessment shows the calculated risk for all vulnerabilities and describes whether the risk should be accepted or mitigated. If mitigated by the implementation of a control, one needs to describe what additional Security Controls will be added to the system.

NIST also initiated the Information Security Automation Program (ISAP) and Security Content Automation Protocol (SCAP) that support and complement the approach for achieving consistent, cost-effective security control assessments.

=== System security plan ===
Agencies should develop policy on the system security planning process. NIST SP-800-18 introduces the concept of a System Security Plan. System security plans are living documents that require periodic review, modification, and plans of action and milestones for implementing security controls. Procedures should be in place outlining who reviews the plans, keeps the plan current, and follows up on planned security controls.

The System security plan is the major input to the security certification and accreditation process for the system. During the security certification and accreditation process, the system security plan is analyzed, updated, and accepted. The certification agent confirms that the security controls described in the system security plan are consistent with the FIPS 199 security category determined for the information system, and that the threat and vulnerability identification and initial risk determination are identified and documented in the system security plan, risk assessment, or equivalent document.

=== Certification and accreditation ===
Once the system documentation and risk assessment has been completed, the system's controls must be reviewed and certified to be functioning appropriately. Based on the results of the review, the information system is accredited. The certification and accreditation process is defined in NIST SP 800-37 "Guide for the Security Certification and Accreditation of Federal Information Systems". Security accreditation is the official management decision given by a senior agency official to authorize operation of an information system and to explicitly accept the risk to agency operations, agency assets, or individuals based on the implementation of an agreed-upon set of security controls. Required by OMB Circular A-130, Appendix III, security accreditation provides a form of quality control and challenges managers and technical staffs at all levels to implement the most effective security controls possible in an information system, given mission requirements, technical constraints, operational constraints, and cost/schedule constraints. By accrediting an information system, an agency official accepts responsibility for the security of the system and is fully accountable for any adverse impacts to the agency if a breach of security occurs. Thus, responsibility and accountability are core principles that characterize security accreditation. It is essential that agency officials have the most complete, accurate, and trustworthy information possible on the security status of their information systems in order to make timely, credible, risk-based decisions on whether to authorize operation of those systems.

The information and supporting evidence needed for security accreditation is developed during a detailed security review of an information system, typically referred to as security certification. Security certification is a comprehensive assessment of the management, operational, and technical security controls in an information system, made in support of security accreditation, to determine the extent to which the controls are implemented correctly, operating as intended, and producing the desired outcome with respect to meeting the security requirements for the system. The results of a security certification are used to reassess the risks and update the system security plan, thus providing the factual basis for an authorizing official to render a security accreditation decision.

=== Continuous monitoring ===
All accredited systems are required to monitor a selected set of security controls and the system documentation is updated to reflect changes and modifications to the system. Large changes to the security profile of the system should trigger an updated risk assessment, and controls that are significantly modified may need to be re-certified.

Continuous monitoring activities include configuration management and control of information system components, security impact analyses of changes to the system, ongoing assessment of security controls, and status reporting. The organization establishes the selection criteria and subsequently selects a subset of the security controls employed within the information system for assessment. The organization also establishes the schedule for control monitoring to ensure adequate coverage is achieved.

== Critique ==
Security experts Bruce Brody, a former federal chief information security officer, and Alan Paller, director of research for the SANS Institute, have described FISMA as "a well-intentioned but fundamentally flawed tool", arguing that the compliance and reporting methodology mandated by FISMA measures security planning rather than measuring information security. Past GAO chief technology officer Keith Rhodes said that FISMA can and has helped government system security but that implementation is everything, and if security people view FISMA as just a checklist, nothing is going to get done.

== See also ==
- Attack (computing)
- Committee on National Security Systems
- Computer security
- Cybersecurity
- Cyberwarfare
- Department of Defense Information Assurance Certification and Accreditation Process
- Federal Desktop Core Configuration – NIST security standards for Windows workstations
- Information assurance
- Information security
- Information security management system
- IT risk
- OMB Circular A-130
- Security Content Automation Protocol – automated testing for security compliance
- Threat (computer)
- Vulnerability (computing)
