= Business.gov =

- Formation: 2004
- Purpose: To improve delivery of services and information to small business in the United States.

Business.gov is sponsored by the U.S. Small Business Administration to provide small business owners with access to federal, state and local government resources from a single access point.

== History ==
Business.gov was launched in 1997 as the U.S. Business Advisor by the National Technical Information Service of the United States Department of Commerce. The U.S. Business Advisor aimed to improve interaction between businesses and government agencies by providing a single resource for finding tools, how-to guides, frequently asked questions, current items of interest, and information on doing transactions with the federal government.

Business.gov was re-launched in May 2004 as a Presidential E-Government Initiative SBA assumed management oversight of Business.gov in partnership with 21 other federal agencies. This partnership, known as the Business Gateway, established Business.gov as the single access point to government services that help the nation's businesses with their operations. The content of the site was primarily aimed at starting, growing, and managing a small business, with an emphasis on government assistance programs and services available from SBA and other federal agencies.

Business Gateway officially re-launched Business.gov on October 12, 2006. as a web portal targeted at helping small and medium-sized businesses find, understand and comply with government regulations. The website has since evolved to provide guidance and resources for all aspects of starting and running a business.

The Business.gov Community launched in March, 2009 as an interactive extension of the website, creating a forum for business owners to interact with government, industry experts and each other through discussion boards, idea exchanges and blog articles.

== Reducing regulatory burden for small businesses ==
Business.gov provides a platform for online services—feature articles, interactive tools and a specialized, Google-based search engine—that help small businesses reduce significant regulatory burdens.

All businesses, large or small, are subject to legal and regulatory burdens. Small businesses face the greatest burden of all. Research conducted and documented by the U.S. Small Business Administration, Office of Advocacy revealed the following:

- Very small firms with fewer than 20 employees spend 45% more per employee than larger firms to comply with federal regulations.
- These very small firms spend 4.5 times as much per employee to comply with environmental regulations and 67% more per employee on tax compliance than their larger counterparts.
- Businesses with fewer than 20 employees spend an average of $7,647 per employee to stay in compliance vs. an average of $5,282 for firms with 500+ employees.
- Firms with fewer than 500 employees represent 99.7% of the 29.6 million businesses in the U.S.; the most recent data show there are only 18,000 large businesses.
- Small businesses generated 64% of net new jobs annually over the past 15 years.
- Small businesses must also comply with labor and safety regulations.

== Small Business Paperwork Relief Act of 2002 ==
The Small Business Paperwork Relief Act (SBPRA) of 2002 requires federal agencies to designate one point of contact to act as a liaison between the agency and small business concerns. SBPRA also requires the Office of Management and Budget (OMB), in conjunction with the Small Business Administration, to publish on the Internet a list of compliance assistance resources available at Federal agencies for small businesses. In accordance with the SBPRA, Business.gov has published a Federal Compliance Contacts page which gives the names, phone numbers and e-mail addresses of individuals at federal agencies that can help small business answer regulatory and legal questions. Business.gov also provides guidance through links to federal, state and local agency resources that help small businesses meet their regulatory requirements.

== Features and services ==
=== Small business resources ===
Business.gov offers a variety of resources that address each phase of a business life cycle from preparing to launch a business to financing growth to ensuring compliance with federal, state and local regulations. Authoritative information is provided through links to other government agencies, fact sheets, guidelines, forms, interactive tools, training resources, and compliance experts.

Business.gov covers a wide variety of business topics and industries. Additionally, there are specific guides for self-employed and home-based businesses; resources for women, veteran and minority business owners; and a portal for non-profits.

=== State and local guides ===
Business.gov includes federal, state and local government information so business owners don't have to know which level government to go to in order to obtain licenses and permits and comply with other laws and regulations. The State & Local guides provide access to programs and services that help small business owners start and expand their operations while complying with state and local laws.

=== Federal, state and local contacts ===
Business.gov provides direct line contacts to federal, state and local personnel who are available by phone or e-mail to answer questions about complying with government regulations.

=== Answers to Frequently Asked Questions (FAQ) ===
Business.gov provides links to FAQ databases from across the federal government in which regulatory agencies provide answers to common business issues. Business.gov's FAQ Directory is organized by topical area.

=== Doing business with the federal government ===
The Business.gov Small Business Guide to Government Contracting provides links to information that helps small to medium-sized business understanding how to contract with the federal government and locate business opportunities.

=== Business search engine ===
The Business.gov search engine uses Custom Search Engine Business Edition, filtering only federal, state and local government websites and pages that are relevant to small business owners.

=== Permit Me ===
"Permit Me" is an interactive search tool that provides a single place for business owners to obtain licenses, permits and registrations needed to run their businesses. Currently, Permit Me only includes information on general licensing requirements and information on ten different business types.

=== Loans & Grants Search Tool ===
The Loans & Grants Search Tool is an interactive search tool that provides a list of financing programs for which a small business may qualify.

=== Business.gov gadgets for website ===
The Business.gov Toolkit is a "gadget" that business owners or small business organizations can place on their websites or iGoogle homepages to provide instant access to essential Business.gov resources without leaving their site.

=== Content partnerships ===
The Business.gov Partners Program works with industry, trade associations and other government agencies to contribute their expertise and resources to Business.gov. Partners also use the site's tools and features as a platform for sharing information and to facilitate outreach and collaboration.

== Model for government-to-business websites ==
Business.gov served as a model for other government websites by fulfilling the goals of President George W. Bush's 2001 President's Management Agenda. The site continues to deliver on the current Administration's Open Government Initiative under President Barack Obama and is showcased on the White House Open Government Innovations Gallery.

Business.gov strictly adheres to all requirements and guidelines for Federal websites, including those established by the E-Government Act of 2002, the U.S. Office of Management and Budget's (OMB) Policies for Federal Public Websites, and Section 508 of the Rehabilitation Act of 1973 regarding website accessibility. The site also strictly follows requirements of the Privacy Act, the Federal Information Security Management Act, and other privacy and security requirements.
