= E-Government Act of 2002 =

2002 United States law

- Other short titles: Federal Information Security Management Act of 2002
- Long title: An Act to enhance the management and promotion of electronic Government services and processes by establishing a Federal Chief Information Officer within the Office of Management and Budget, and by establishing a broad framework of measures that require using Internet-based information technology to enhance citizen access to Government information and services, and for other purposes.
- Nicknames: Confidential Information Protection and Statistical Efficiency Act of 2002
- Enacted by: the 107th United States Congress
- Effective: December 17, 2002

Citations
- Public law: 107-347
- Statutes at Large: 116 Stat. 2899

Codification
- Titles amended: 44 U.S.C.: Public Printing and Documents
- U.S.C. sections created: 44 U.S.C. ch. 36 § 3601 et seq.; 44 U.S.C. ch. 35, subch. III § 3541 et seq.
- U.S.C. sections amended: 44 U.S.C. ch. 1 § 101; 44 U.S.C. ch. 35, subch. I § 3501 et seq.

Legislative history
- Introduced in the House as H.R. 2458 by Jim Turner (D–TX) on July 11, 2001; Committee consideration by House Government Reform, House Judiciary; Passed the House on November 15, 2002 (passed without objection); Passed the Senate on November 15, 2002 (passed unanimous consent); Signed into law by President George W. Bush on December 17, 2002

The E-Government Act of 2002 (Pub. L. 107–347 (text) (PDF), 116 Stat. 2899, 44 U.S.C. § 101, H.R. 2458/S. 803), is a United States statute enacted on 17 December 2002, with an effective date for most provisions of 17 April 2003. Its stated purpose is to improve the management and promotion of electronic government services and processes by establishing a Federal Chief Information Officer within the Office of Management and Budget, and by establishing a framework of measures that require using Internet-based information technology to improve citizen access to government information and services, and for other purposes.

The statute includes within it:

- FISMA (the Federal Information Security Management Act of 2002) as Title III, and
- CIPSEA (the Confidential Information Protection and Statistical Efficiency Act) as Title V.

== Provisions ==
- To provide effective leadership of Federal Government efforts to develop and promote electronic Government services and processes by establishing an Administrator of a new Office of Electronic Government within the Office of Management and Budget.
- To promote use of the Internet and other information technologies to provide increased opportunities for citizen participation in Government.
- To promote inter-agency collaboration in providing electronic Government services, where this collaboration would improve the service to citizens by integrating related functions, and in the use of internal electronic Government processes, where this collaboration would improve the efficiency and effectiveness of the processes.
- To improve the ability of the Government to achieve agency missions and program performance goals.
- To promote the use of the Internet and emerging technologies within and across Government agencies to provide citizen-centric Government information and services.
- To reduce costs and burdens for businesses and other Government entities.
- To promote better informed decision making by policy makers.
- To promote access to high quality Government information and services across multiple channels.
- To make the Federal Government more transparent and accountable.
- To transform agency operations by utilizing, where appropriate, best practices from public and private sector organizations.
- To provide enhanced access to Government information and services in a manner consistent with laws regarding protection of personal privacy, national security, records retention, access for persons with disabilities, and other relevant laws.

== Lawsuits ==
=== PACER ===
Section 205(c)(1) requires the federal judiciary to make any document that is filed electronically publicly available online. Section 205(e) amended Section 303(a) of the Judiciary Appropriations Act, 1992 to read:

The Judicial Conference may, only to the extent necessary, prescribe reasonable fees, pursuant to sections 1913, 1914, 1926, 1930, and 1932 of title 28, United States Code, for collection by the courts under those sections for access to information available through automatic data processing equipment.

In April 2016, three non-profit organizations—the Alliance for Justice, the National Veterans Legal Services Program and the National Consumer Law Center—filed a class-action lawsuit in the U.S. District Court for the District of Columbia, alleging that the judiciary's PACER fee structure violates Section 205(e) in that the fees were not only being used to maintain the system itself, but were being diverted to cover other costs of the federal courts, including courtroom audio systems and flat-screen televisions for jury use. In March 2018, the judge ruled that the PACER fees were impermissibly used to cover unrelated costs. As of October 2019, that holding is under appeal to the Court of Appeals for the Federal Circuit.

=== Office of Personnel Management ===
In 2025, federal employees sued the Office of Personnel Management, seeking a class action designation, for allegedly violating privacy provisions of the E-Government Act by not properly protecting federal employee personal data security in deploying a new mass communication tool for the federal workforce.

== See also ==
- Privacy Act of 1974
- Business.gov
- Teleadministration
- Data privacy
- Digital identity
- Privacy
- Civil liberties
- Information privacy law
- Federal Records Act
