= FIPS 199 =

FIPS 199 (Federal Information Processing Standard Publication 199, Standards for Security Categorization of Federal Information and Information Systems) is a United States Federal Government standard that establishes security categories of information systems used by the Federal Government, one component of risk assessment. FIPS 199 and FIPS 200 are mandatory security standards as required by FISMA.

FIPS 199 requires Federal agencies to assess their information systems in each of the confidentiality, integrity, and availability categories, rating each system as low, moderate, or high impact in each category. The most severe rating from any category becomes the information system's overall security categorization.
