= Department of Defense Information Assurance Certification and Accreditation Process =

Computer security process

The DoD Information Assurance Certification and Accreditation Process (DIACAP) is a deprecated United States Department of Defense (DoD) process meant to ensure companies and organizations applied risk management to information systems (IS). DIACAP defined a DoD-wide formal and standard set of activities, general tasks and a management structure process for the certification and accreditation (C&A) of a DoD IS which maintained the information assurance (IA) posture throughout the system's life cycle.

As of May 2015, the DIACAP was replaced by the "Risk Management Framework (RMF) for DoD Information Technology (IT)". Although re-accreditations via DIACAP continued through late 2016, systems that had not yet started accreditation by May 2015 were required to transition to the RMF processes. The DoD RMF aligns with the National Institute of Standards and Technology (NIST) Risk Management Framework (RMF).

== History ==
DIACAP resulted from an NSA directed shift in underlying security approaches. An interim version of the DIACAP was signed July 6, 2006, and superseded the interim DITSCAP guidance. The final version is called Department of Defense Instruction 8510.01, and was signed on March 12, 2014 (previous version was November 28, 2007).

DODI 8500.01 Cybersecurity http://www.dtic.mil/whs/directives/corres/pdf/850001_2014.pdf,

DODI 8510.01 Risk Management Framework (RMF) for DoD Information Technology (IT) https://irp.fas.org/doddir/dod/i8510_01.pdf

DIACAP differed from DITSCAP in several ways—in particular, in its embrace of the idea of information assurance controls (defined in DoDD 8500.1 and DoDI 8500.2) as the primary set of security requirements for all automated information systems (AISs). Applicable IA Controls were assigned based on the system's mission assurance category (MAC) and confidentiality level (CL).

== Process ==
- System Identification Profile
- DIACAP Implementation Plan
- Validation
- Certification Determination
- DIACAP Scorecard
- POA&M
- Authorization to Operate Decision
- Residual Risk Acceptance

== See also ==
- Risk Management Framework - successor to DIACAP
