= Federal government of the United States =

National government

United States federal government
- Coat of arms
- Formation: March 4, 1789; 237 years ago
- Founding document: United States Constitution
- Jurisdiction: United States
- Website: usa.gov whitehouse.gov congress.gov supremecourt.gov

Legislative branch
- Legislature: Congress
- Meeting place: Capitol

Executive branch
- Leader: President
- Appointer: Electoral College
- Headquarters: White House, Washington D.C.
- Main organ: Cabinet
- Departments: 15

Judicial branch
- Court: Supreme Court
- Seat: Supreme Court Building

The federal government of the United States (U.S. federal government or U.S. government) (Note: The U.S. Government Publishing Office specifies the capitalization of Federal Government, in regards to the national government of the United States, as a proper noun.) is the national government of the United States.

The United States federal government is composed of three distinct branches: legislative, executive, and judicial. The powers of these three branches are defined and vested by the Constitution of the United States, which has been in effect since 1789. The powers and duties of these branches are further defined by acts of Congress, including the creation of executive departments and courts subordinate to the Supreme Court of the United States.

In the federal division of power, the federal government shares sovereignty with each of the 50 states in their respective territories. United States law recognizes Indigenous tribes as possessing sovereign powers, while being subject to federal jurisdiction.

== Naming ==
A diagram of the political system of the United States

The full name of the republic is the "United States of America". No other names appear in the Constitution, (except for the shorter “United States” for which it is usually addressed in it) and this is the name that appears on currency, in treaties and documents, and in legal cases to which the nation is a party. The terms "Government of the United States of America" or "United States Government" are often used in official documents to represent the federal government as distinct from the states collectively.

In casual conversation or writing, the term "Federal Government" is often used, and the term "U.S. Government" is sometimes used. The terms "Federal" and "National" in government agency or program names generally indicate affiliation with the federal government; for instance, the Federal Bureau of Investigation, National Oceanic and Atmospheric Administration, and National Park Service. "Washington" and "White House" are sometimes used as a metonym for the federal government because Washington, D.C., is the seat of government and the latter as its headquarters, respectively.

== History ==
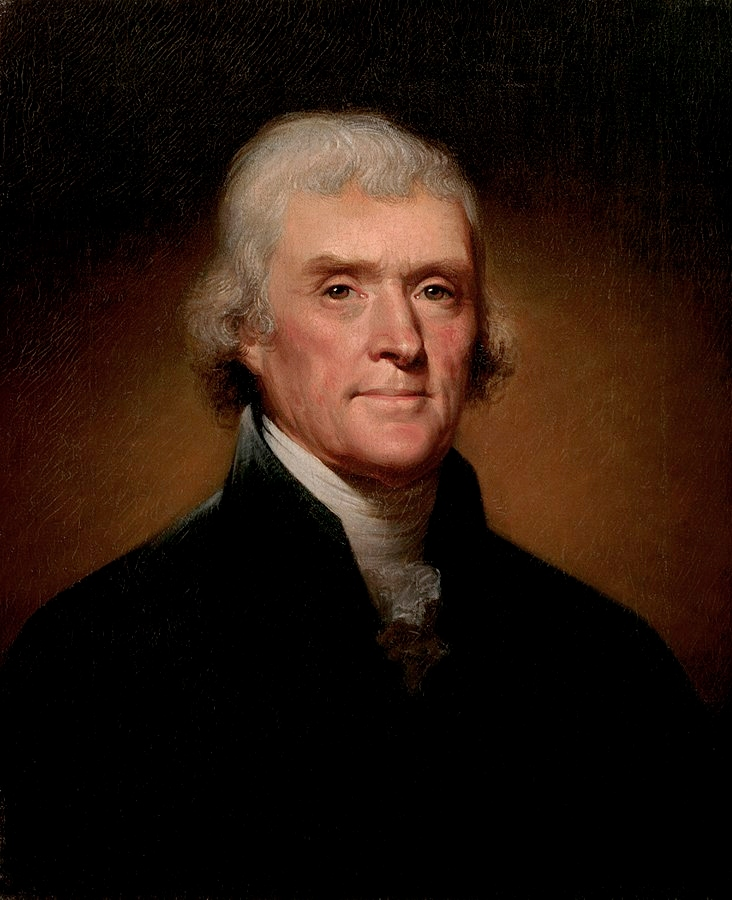
Thomas Jefferson, the principal author of the Declaration of Independence, largely wrote the Declaration's first draft in isolation between over a period of two weeks in June 1776 from the second floor of a three-story home he was renting at 700 Market Street in Philadelphia; the document was then reviewed and ultimately unanimously adopted by each of the 56 delegates to the Second Continental Congress.

The U.S. government was established in a series of initiatives in the late 18th century, starting with its decision to establish the Continental Army and appoint George Washington as its commander. The Continental Army resisted the British during the American Revolutionary War, which began in 1775. The following year, in July 1776, delegates to the Second Continental Congress, gathered at present-day Independence Hall in the colonial capital of Philadelphia, unanimously adopted the United States Declaration of Independence with each of the 56 colonial-era delegates signing it. In September 1783, the Thirteen Colonies ultimately prevailed over the British in the Revolutionary War, establishing the United States as an independent nation. On March 4, 1789, again gathered in Philadelphia, the colonies ratified and adopted the Constitution of the United States, which established the nation's federal rule of law and was largely based on federalism, republicanism and democracy.

Under the U.S. Constitution, the power of the U.S. federal government is shared between its executive, legislative, and judicial branches, state governments, and the people. It is a mixed system, neither pure republic nor pure democracy, and often described as a democratic republic, representative democracy, or constitutional republic.

The interpretation and execution of these principles, including what powers the federal government should have and how those powers can be exercised, have been debated ever since the adoption of the Constitution. Some make a case for expansive federal powers while others argue for a more limited role for the central government in relation to individuals, the states, or other recognized entities.

Since the American Civil War, the powers of the federal government have expanded greatly, although there have been periods since that time when the legislative branch was more powerful, including the decades immediately following the Civil War, or when states' rights proponents have succeeded in limiting federal power through legislative action, executive prerogative or by a constitutional interpretation by the courts.

One of the theoretical pillars of the U.S. Constitution is the idea of "checks and balances" among the powers and responsibilities of the three branches of American government: the executive, the legislative, and the judiciary. For example, while Congress, the federal government's legislative branch, has the power to create laws, the executive branch under the president can veto legislation, an act which, in turn, can be overridden by Congress. The president nominates judges to the nation's highest judiciary authority, the Supreme Court (as well as to lower federal courts), but those nominees must be approved by Congress. The Supreme Court, in turn, can invalidate unconstitutional laws passed by the Congress.

== Legislative branch ==
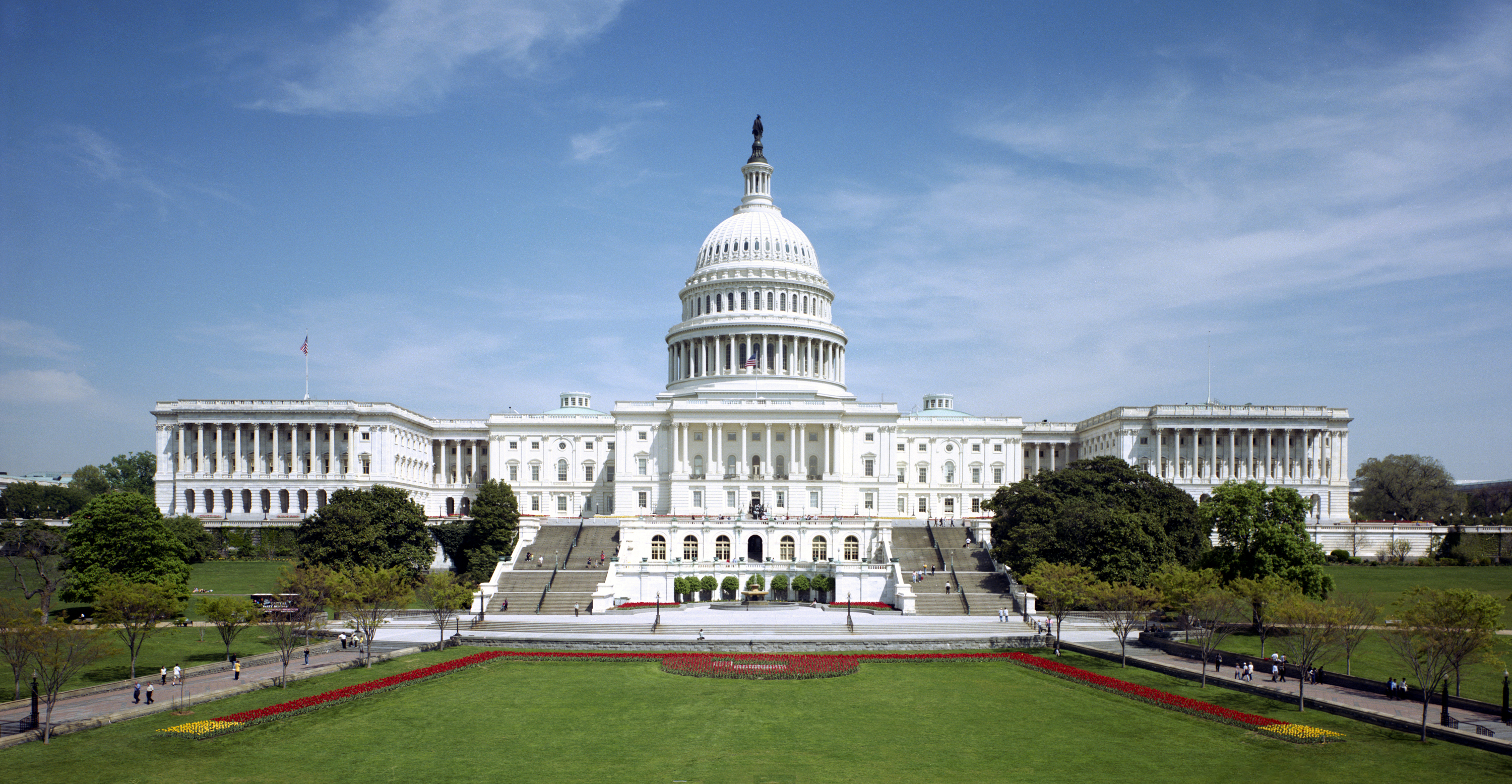
The United States Capitol, the seat of government for Congress, the legislative branch of the U.S. government

The United States Congress, under Article I of the Constitution, is the legislative branch of the federal government. It is bicameral, comprising the House of Representatives and the Senate.

=== Makeup of Congress ===
==== House of Representatives ====
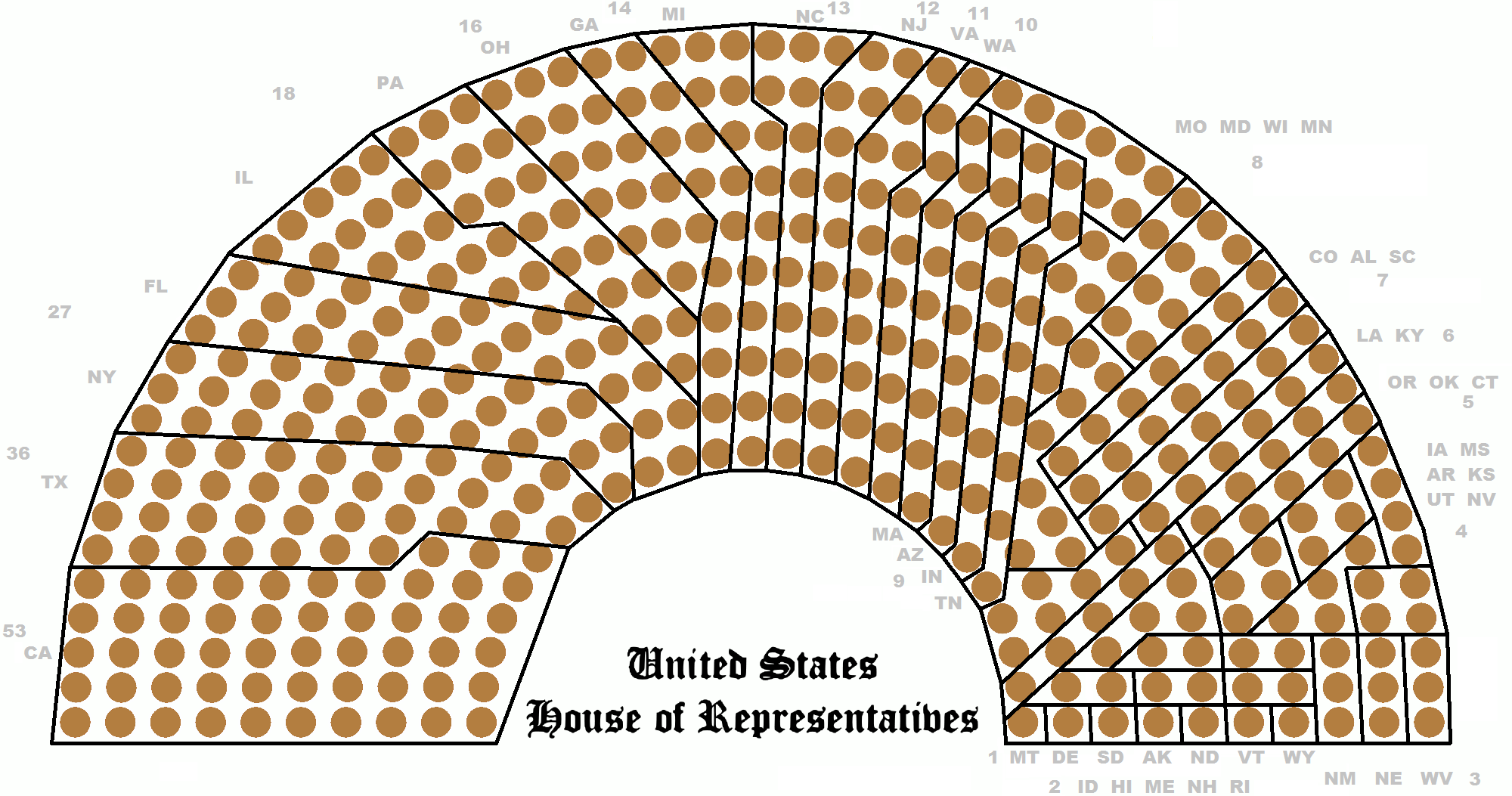
The 435 seats of the U.S. House of Representatives grouped by state

The U.S. House of Representatives is made up of 435 voting members, each of whom represents a congressional district in a state from where they were elected. Apportionment of seats among the 50 states is determined by state populations, and it is updated after each decennial U.S. Census. Each member serves a two-year term.

In order to be elected as a representative, an individual must be at least 25 years of age, must have been a U.S. citizen for at least seven years, and must live in the state that they represent.

In addition to the 435 voting members, there are six non-voting members, consisting of five delegates and one resident commissioner. There is one delegate each from Washington, D.C., Guam, the Virgin Islands, American Samoa, the Commonwealth of the Northern Mariana Islands, and a resident commissioner from Puerto Rico.

Unlike the U.S. Senate, all members of the U.S. House must be elected and cannot be appointed. In the case of a vacancy, the seat must be filled through a special election, as required under Article 1 of the U.S. Constitution.

==== Senate ====
In contrast, the Senate is made up of two senators from each state, regardless of population. There are currently 100 senators (2 from each of the 50 states), who each serve six-year terms. Approximately one-third of the Senate stands for election every two years.

If a vacancy occurs, the state governor appoints a replacement to complete the term or to hold the office until a special election can take place.

==== Separate powers ====
The House and Senate each have particular exclusive powers. For example, the Senate must approve (give "advice and consent" to) many important presidential appointments, including cabinet officers, federal judges (including nominees to the Supreme Court), department secretaries (heads of federal executive branch departments), U.S. military and naval officers, and ambassadors to foreign countries. All legislative bills for raising revenue must originate in the House of Representatives. The approval of both chambers is required to pass all legislation, which then may only become law by being signed by the president (or, if the president vetoes the bill, both houses of Congress then re-pass the bill, but by a two-thirds majority of each chamber, in which case the bill becomes law without the president's signature). The powers of Congress are limited to those enumerated in the Constitution; all other powers are reserved to the states and the people.

The Constitution also includes the Necessary and Proper Clause, which grants Congress the power to "make all laws which shall be necessary and proper for carrying into execution the foregoing powers". Members of the House and Senate are elected by first-past-the-post voting in every state except Louisiana and Georgia, which have runoffs, and Maine and Alaska, which use ranked-choice voting.

==== Impeachment of federal officers ====
Congress has the power to remove the president, federal judges, and other federal officers from office. The House of Representatives and Senate have separate roles in this process. The House must first vote to impeach the official. Then, a trial is held in the Senate to decide whether the official should be removed from office. As of 2023, three presidents have been impeached: Andrew Johnson, Bill Clinton, and Donald Trump (twice). None of the three were removed from office following trial in the Senate.

==== Congressional procedures ====
Article I, Section 2, paragraph 2 of the U.S. Constitution gives each chamber the power to "determine the rules of its proceedings". From this provision were created congressional committees, which do the work of drafting legislation and conducting congressional investigations into national matters. The 118th Congress (2023–2025) has 20 standing committees in the House and 19 in the Senate, plus 4 joint permanent committees with members from both houses overseeing the Library of Congress, printing, taxation, and the economy. In addition, each house may name special, or select, committees to study specific problems. Today, much of the congressional workload is borne by the subcommittees, of which there are around 150.

=== Powers of Congress ===
The Constitution grants numerous powers to Congress. Enumerated in Article I, Section 8, these include the powers to levy and collect taxes; to coin money and regulate its value; provide for punishment for counterfeiting; establish post offices and roads, issue patents, create federal courts inferior to the Supreme Court, combat piracies and felonies, declare war, raise and support armies, provide and maintain a navy, make rules for the regulation of land and naval forces, provide for, arm and discipline the militia, exercise exclusive legislation in the District of Columbia, regulate interstate commerce, and to make laws necessary to properly execute powers. Over the two centuries since the United States was formed, many disputes have arisen over the limits on the powers of the federal government. These disputes have often been the subject of lawsuits that have ultimately been decided by the United States Supreme Court.

==== Congressional oversight ====
Congressional oversight is intended to prevent waste and fraud, protect civil liberties and individual rights, ensure executive compliance with the law, gather information for making laws and educating the public, and evaluate executive performance.

It applies to cabinet departments, executive agencies, regulatory commissions, and the presidency.

Congress's oversight function takes many forms:

- Committee inquiries and hearings
- Formal consultations with and reports from the president
- Senate advice and consent for presidential nominations and for treaties
- House impeachment proceedings and subsequent Senate trials
- House and Senate proceedings under the 25th Amendment if the president becomes disabled or if the office of the vice president falls vacant
- Informal meetings between legislators and executive officials
- Congressional membership: each state is allocated a number of seats based on its representation (or ostensible representation, in the case of D.C.) in the House of Representatives. Each state is allocated two senators regardless of its population. As of November 2023, the District of Columbia elects a non-voting representative to the House of Representatives along with American Samoa, the U.S. Virgin Islands, Guam, Puerto Rico, and the Northern Mariana Islands.

== Executive branch ==
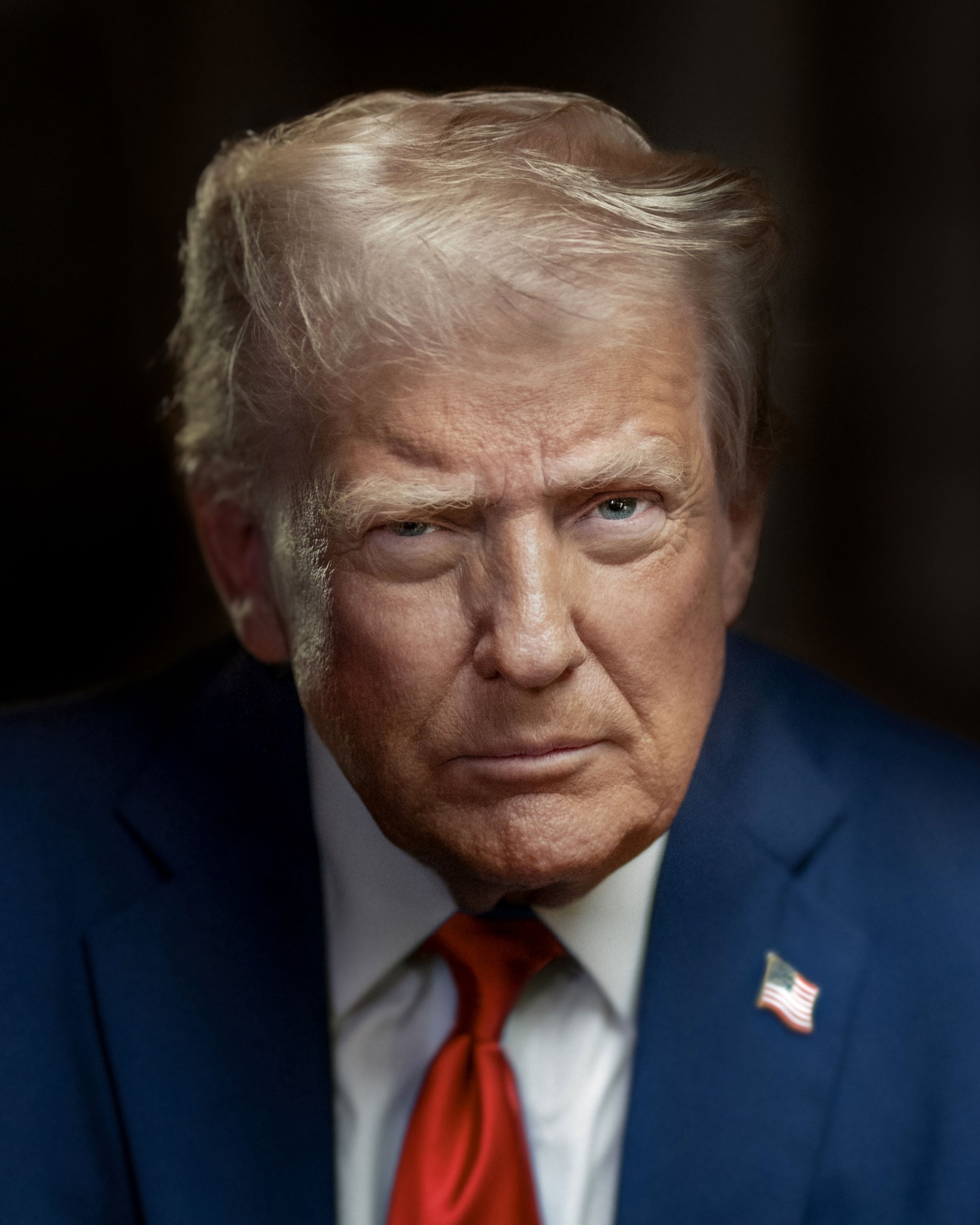
Donald Trump
47th president

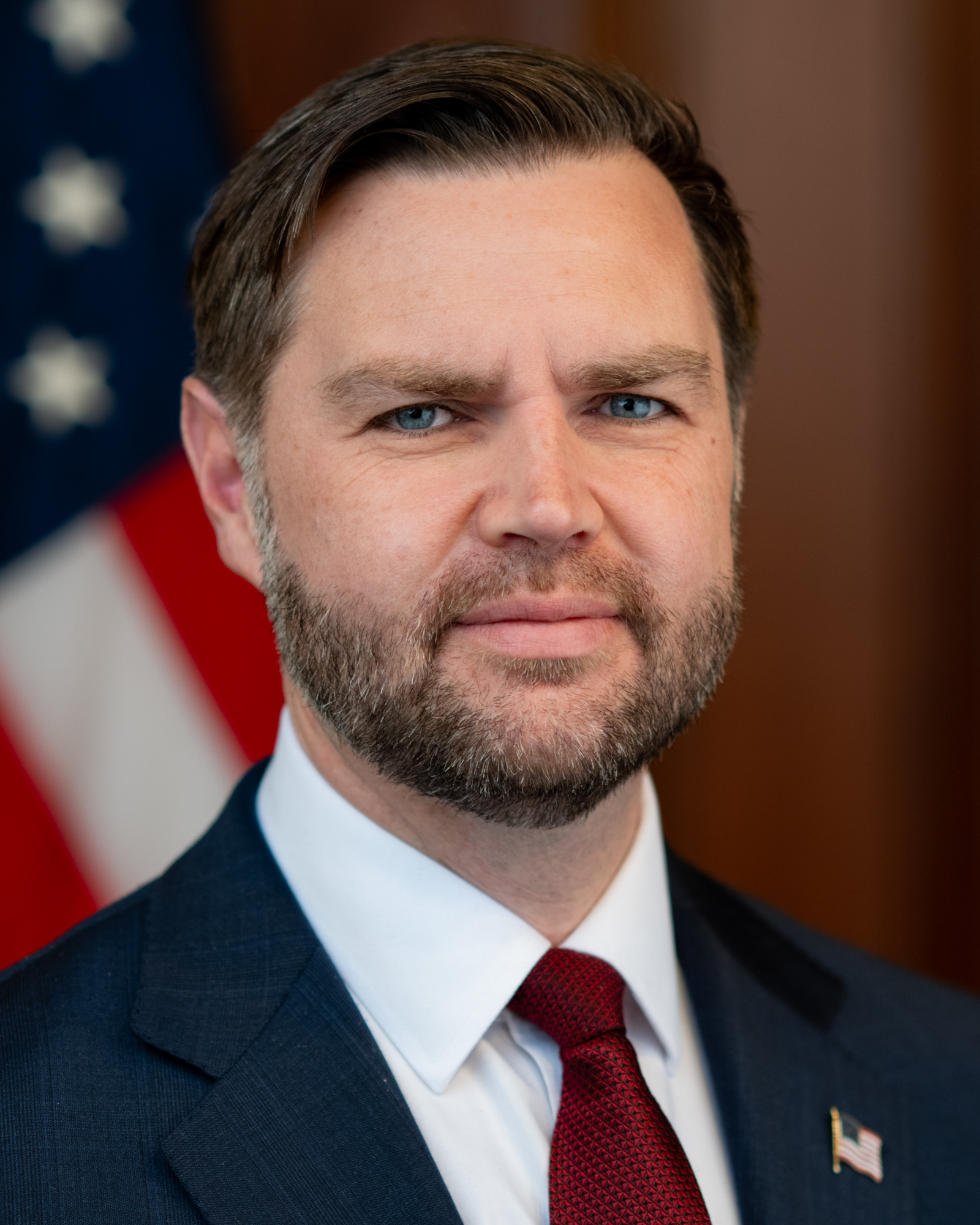
JD Vance
50th vice president

since January 20, 2025

=== President ===
The seal of the president of the United States

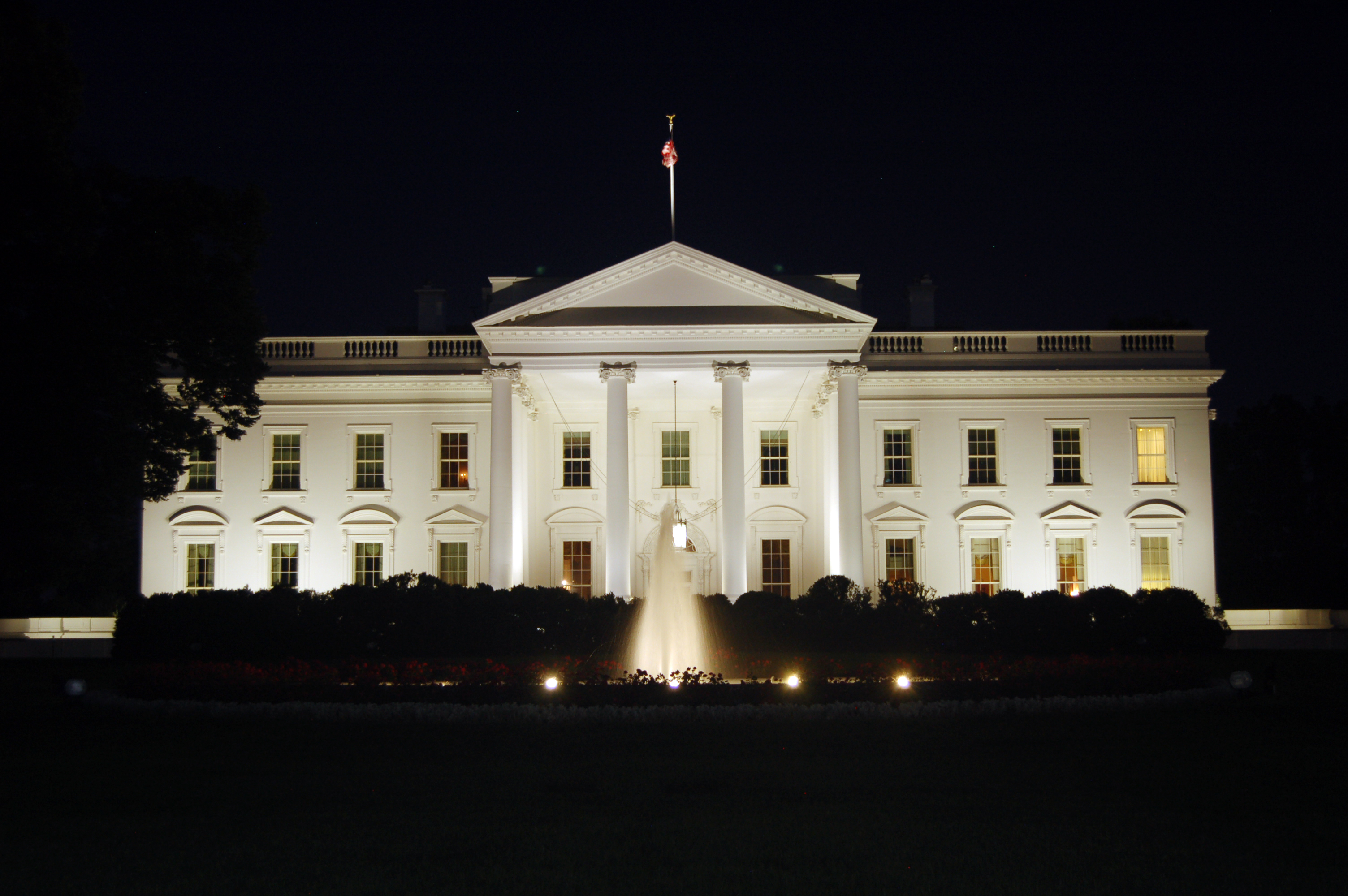
The White House includes the office of the U.S. president, known as the Oval Office, and the offices of key presidential advisors and staff.

==== Executive powers and duties ====
The executive branch is established in Article Two of the United States Constitution, which vests executive power in the president of the United States. The president is both the head of state (performing ceremonial functions) and the head of government (the chief executive). The Constitution directs the president to "take care that the laws be faithfully executed" and requires the president to swear or affirm to "preserve, protect and defend the Constitution of the United States." Legal scholars William P. Marshall and Saikrishna Prakash write of the Clause: "the President may neither breach federal law nor order their subordinates to do so, for defiance cannot be considered faithful execution. The Constitution also incorporates the English bars on dispensing or suspending the law, with some supposing that the Clause itself prohibits both." Many presidential actions are undertaken via executive orders, presidential proclamations, and presidential memoranda.

The president is the commander-in-chief of the armed forces. Under the Reception Clause, the president is empowered to "receive Ambassadors and other public Ministers"; the president has broad authority to conduct foreign relations, is generally considered to have the sole power of diplomatic recognition, and is the United States' chief diplomat, although the Congress also has an important role in legislating on foreign affairs, and can, for example, "institute a trade embargo, declare war upon a foreign government that the President had recognized, or decline to appropriate funds for an embassy in that country." The president may also negotiate and sign treaties, but ratifying treaties requires the consent of two-thirds of the Senate.

Article II's Appointments Clause provides that the president "shall nominate, and by and with the Advice and Consent of the Senate, shall appoint Ambassadors, other public Ministers and Consuls, Judges of the supreme Court, and all other Officers of the United States" while providing that "Congress may by Law vest the Appointment of such inferior Officers, as they think proper, in the President alone, in the Courts of Law, or in the Heads of Departments." These appointments delegate "by legal authority a portion of the sovereign powers of the federal government."

The Constitution grants the president the "Power to grant Reprieves and Pardons for Offences against the United States, except in Cases of Impeachment"; this clemency power includes the power to issue absolute or conditional pardons, and to issue commute sentences, to remit fines, and to issue general amnesties. The presidential clemency power extends only to federal crimes, and not to state crimes.

The president has informal powers beyond their formal powers. For example, the president has major agenda-setting powers to influence lawmaking and policymaking, and typically has a major role as the leader of their political party.

==== Election, succession, and term limits ====
The president and vice president are normally elected as running mates by the Electoral College; each state has a number of electoral votes equal to the size of its Congressional delegation (i.e., its number of Representatives in the House plus its two senators). The District of Columbia has a number of electoral votes "equal to the whole number of Senators and Representatives in Congress to which the District would be entitled if it were a State, but in no event more than the least populous State". A President may also be seated by succession. As originally drafted, there was no limit to the time a President could serve, however the Twenty-second Amendment, ratified in 1951, originally limits any president to serving two four-year terms (8 years); the amendment specifically "caps the service of a president at 10 years" by providing that "if a person succeeds to the office of president without election and serves less than two years, he may run for two full terms; otherwise, a person succeeding to office of president can serve no more than a single elected term."

==== Veto power, impeachment, and other issues ====
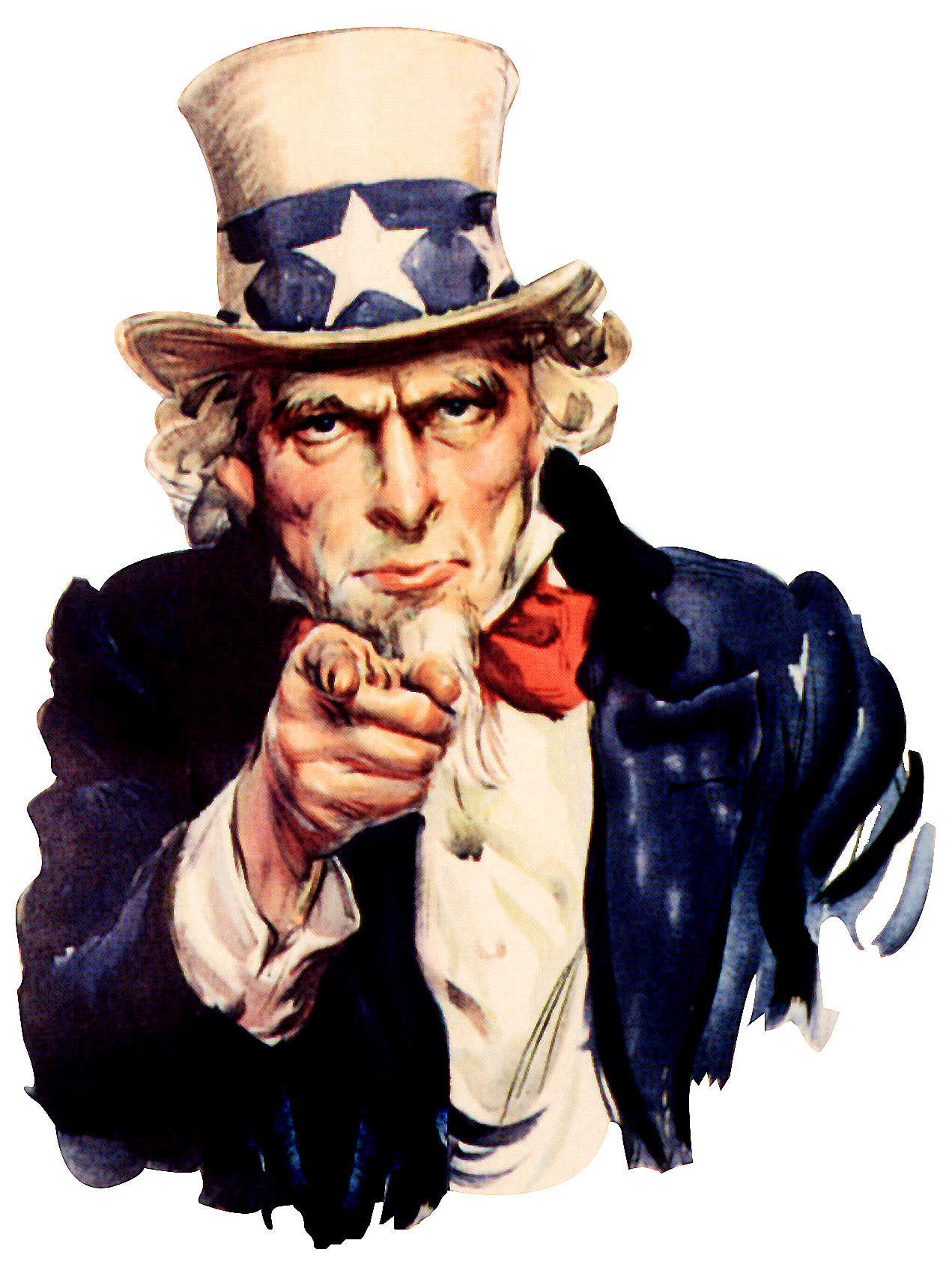
Uncle Sam, a common personification of the U.S. federal government, depicted in an early 20th century illustration

Under the Presentment Clause of Article I, a bill that passes both chambers of Congress shall be presented to the president, who may sign the bill into law or veto the bill by returning it to the chamber where it originated. If the president neither signs nor vetoes a bill "within ten Days (Sundays excepted) after it shall have been presented to him" it becomes a law without the president's signature, "unless the Congress by their Adjournment prevent its Return in which Case it shall not be a Law" (called a pocket veto). A presidential veto may be overridden by a two-thirds vote in both houses of Congress; this occurs relatively infrequently.

The president may be impeached by a majority in the House and removed from office by a two-thirds majority in the Senate for "treason, bribery, or other high crimes and misdemeanors".

The president may not dissolve Congress, but has the power to adjourn Congress whenever the House and Senate cannot agree when to adjourn; no president has ever used this power. The president also has the constitutional power to, "on extraordinary Occasions, convene both Houses, or either of them"; this power has been used "to consider nominations, war, and emergency legislation." This Section invests the President with the discretion to convene Congress on "extraordinary occasions"; this special session power has been used to call the chambers to consider urgent matters.

=== Vice president ===
Seal of the vice president of the United States

The vice president is the second-highest official in rank of the federal government. The vice president's duties and powers are established in the legislative branch of the federal government under Article 1, Section 3, Clauses 4 and 5 as the president of the Senate; this means that they are the designated presiding officer of the Senate. In that capacity, the vice president has the authority (ex officio, for they are not an elected member of the Senate) to cast a tie-breaking vote. Pursuant to the Twelfth Amendment, the vice president presides over the joint session of Congress when it convenes to count the vote of the Electoral College. As first in the U.S. presidential line of succession, the vice president's duties and powers move to the executive branch when becoming president upon the death, resignation, or removal of the president, which has happened nine times in U.S. history. Lastly, in the case of a Twenty-fifth Amendment succession event, the vice president would become acting president, assuming all of the powers and duties of president, except being designated as president. Accordingly, by circumstances, the Constitution designates the vice president as routinely in the legislative branch, or succeeding to the executive branch as president, or possibly being in both as acting president pursuant to the Twenty-fifth Amendment. Because of circumstances, the overlapping nature of the duties and powers attributed to the office, the title of the office, and other matters have generated a spirited scholarly dispute regarding attaching an exclusive branch designation to the office of vice president.

=== Cabinet, executive departments, and agencies ===
Article II, Section 2 of the Constitution sets forth the creation of a presidential Cabinet. The role of the Cabinet is to advise the president and carry out the programs and laws of the federal government. The Cabinet is composed of the vice president and the leaders of 15 executive departments. Those executive departments are the Departments of State, Treasury, Defense, Justice, Interior, Agriculture, Commerce, Labor, Health and Human Services, Housing and Urban Development, Transportation, Energy, Education, Veterans Affairs, and Homeland Security.

Additionally, there are seven other members of the Cabinet who are appointed by the president. These are the White House Chief of Staff, Administrator of the Environmental Protection Agency, Director of the Office of Management & Budget, United States Trade Representative, U.S. Ambassador to the United Nations, Chairman of the Council of Economic Advisers, and Administrator of the Small Business Administration.

The heads of the 15 departments are chosen by the president and approved with the "advice and consent" of the U.S. Senate. Once confirmed, these "Cabinet secretaries" serve at the pleasure of the president.

In addition to the executive departments, a number of staff organizations are grouped into the Executive Office of the President (EOP), which was created in 1939 by President Franklin D. Roosevelt. The EOP is overseen by the White House Chief of Staff. The EOP includes the White House staff, the National Security Council, the Office of Management and Budget, the Council of Economic Advisers, the Council on Environmental Quality, the Office of the U.S. Trade Representative, the Office of National Drug Control Policy, and the Office of Science and Technology Policy.

Outside of the EOP and the executive departments are a number of independent agencies. These include the United States Postal Service (USPS), NASA, the Central Intelligence Agency (CIA), the Environmental Protection Agency (EPA), and the United States Agency for International Development (USAID). In addition, there are government-owned corporations, including the Federal Deposit Insurance Corporation and the National Railroad Passenger Corporation.

== Judicial branch ==
The Judiciary, under Article III of the Constitution, explains and applies the laws. This branch does this by hearing and eventually making decisions on various legal cases.

=== Overview of the federal judiciary ===
Seal of the U.S. Supreme Court

Article III section I of the Constitution establishes the Supreme Court of the United States and authorizes the United States Congress to establish inferior courts as their need shall arise. Section I also establishes a lifetime tenure for all federal judges and states that their compensation may not be diminished during their time in office. Article II section II establishes that all federal judges are to be appointed by the president and confirmed by the United States Senate.

The Judiciary Act of 1789 subdivided the nation jurisdictionally into judicial districts and created federal courts for each district. The three tiered structure of this act established the basic structure of the national judiciary: the Supreme Court, 13 courts of appeals, 94 district courts, and two courts of special jurisdiction. Congress retains the power to re-organize or even abolish federal courts lower than the Supreme Court.

The U.S. Supreme Court decides cases and controversies, which include matters pertaining to the federal government, disputes between states, and interpretation of the United States Constitution, and, in general, can declare legislation or executive action made at any level of the government as unconstitutional, nullifying the law and creating precedent for future law and decisions. The United States Constitution does not specifically mention the power of judicial review, which is the power to declare a law unconstitutional. There have been instances in the past where such declarations have been ignored by the other two branches. Below the U.S. Supreme Court are the United States courts of appeals, and below them in turn are the United States district courts, which are the general trial courts for federal law, and for certain controversies between litigants who are not deemed citizens of the same state, known as diversity jurisdiction.

There are three levels of federal courts with general jurisdiction, which are courts that handle both criminal and civil suits between individuals. Other courts, such as the bankruptcy courts and the U.S. Tax Court, are specialized courts handling only certain kinds of cases, known as subject matter jurisdiction. The bankruptcy courts are supervised by the district courts, and, as such, are not considered part of the Article III judiciary. As such, their judges do not have lifetime tenure, nor are they constitutionally exempt from any diminution of their remuneration. The Tax Court is an Article I Court, not an Article III Court.

The district courts are the trial courts wherein cases that are considered under the Judicial Code (Title 28, United States Code) consistent with the jurisdictional precepts of federal question jurisdiction, diversity jurisdiction, and pendent jurisdiction can be filed and decided. The district courts can also hear cases under removal jurisdiction, wherein a case brought in a state court meets the requirements for diversity jurisdiction, and one party litigant chooses to "remove" the case from state court to federal court.

The United States Courts of Appeals are appellate courts that hear appeals of cases decided by the district courts, and some direct appeals from administrative agencies, and some interlocutory appeals. The U.S. Supreme Court hears appeals from the decisions of the courts of appeals or state supreme courts, and in addition has original jurisdiction over a few cases.

The judicial power extends to cases arising under the Constitution, an Act of Congress; a U.S. treaty; cases affecting ambassadors, ministers and consuls of foreign countries in the U.S.; cases and controversies to which the federal government is a party; controversies between states (or their citizens) and foreign nations (or their citizens or subjects); and bankruptcy cases (collectively "federal-question jurisdiction"). The Eleventh Amendment removed from federal jurisdiction cases in which citizens of one state were the plaintiffs and the government of another state was the defendant. It did not disturb federal jurisdiction in cases in which a state government is a plaintiff and a citizen of another state the defendant.

The power of the federal courts extends both to civil actions for damages and other redress, and to criminal cases arising under federal law. The interplay of the Supremacy Clause and Article III has resulted in a complex set of relationships between state and federal courts. Federal courts can sometimes hear cases arising under state law pursuant to diversity jurisdiction, state courts can decide certain matters involving federal law, and a handful of federal claims are primarily reserved by federal statute to the state courts. Both court systems have exclusive jurisdiction in some areas and concurrent jurisdiction in others.

The U.S. Constitution safeguards judicial independence by providing that federal judges shall hold office "during good behavior"; in practice, this usually means they serve until they die, retire, or resign. A judge who commits an offense while in office may be impeached in the same way as the president or other officials of the federal government. U.S. judges are appointed by the president, subject to confirmation by the Senate. Another Constitutional provision prohibits Congress from reducing the pay of any present Article III judge. However, Congress is able to set a lower salary for all future judges who take office after such a pay reduction is passed by Congress.

=== Relationships between state and federal courts ===
Separate from, but not entirely independent of, this federal court system are the court systems of each state, each dealing with, in addition to federal law when not deemed preempted, a state's own laws, and having its own court rules and procedures. Although state governments and the federal government are legally dual sovereigns, the Supreme Court of the United States is in many cases the appellate court from the State Supreme Courts (e.g., absent the Court countenancing the applicability of the doctrine of adequate and independent State grounds). The Supreme Courts of each state are by this doctrine the final authority on the interpretation of the applicable state's laws and Constitution. Many state constitution provisions are equal in breadth to those of the U.S. Constitution, but are considered "parallel" (thus, where, for example, the right to privacy pursuant to a state constitution is broader than the federal right to privacy, and the asserted ground is explicitly held to be "independent", the question can be finally decided in a State Supreme Court—the U.S. Supreme Court will decline to take jurisdiction).

A State Supreme Court, other than of its own accord, is bound only by the U.S. Supreme Court's interpretation of federal law, but is not bound by interpretation of federal law by the federal court of appeals for the federal circuit in which the state is included, or even the federal district courts located in the state, a result of the dual sovereigns concept. Conversely, a federal district court hearing a matter involving only a question of state law (usually through diversity jurisdiction) must apply the substantive law of the state in which the court sits, a result of the application of the Erie Doctrine; however, at the same time, the case is heard under the Federal Rules of Civil Procedure, the Federal Rules of Criminal Procedure and the Federal Rules of Evidence instead of state procedural rules (that is, the application of the Erie Doctrine only extends to a requirement that a federal court asserting diversity jurisdiction apply substantive state law, but not procedural state law, which may be different).

== Budget ==
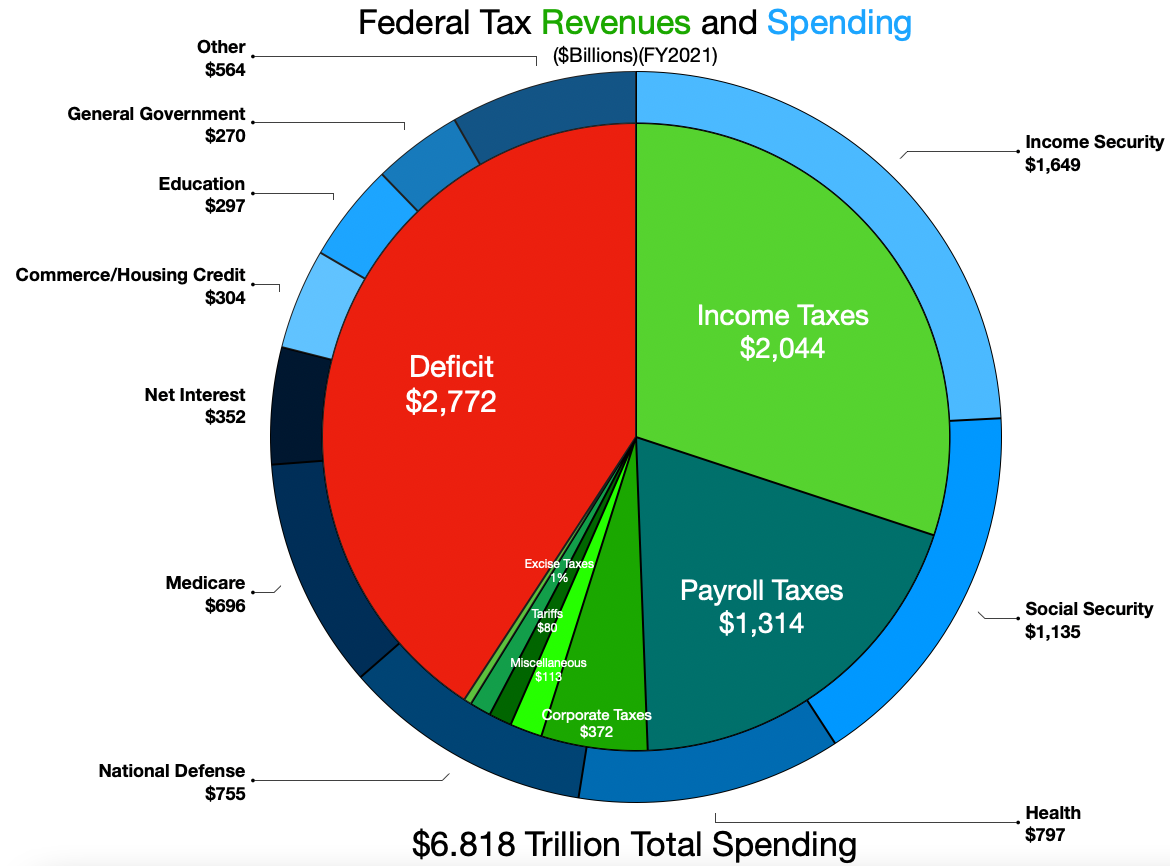
Federal revenue and spending of the U.S. federal government as of 2021

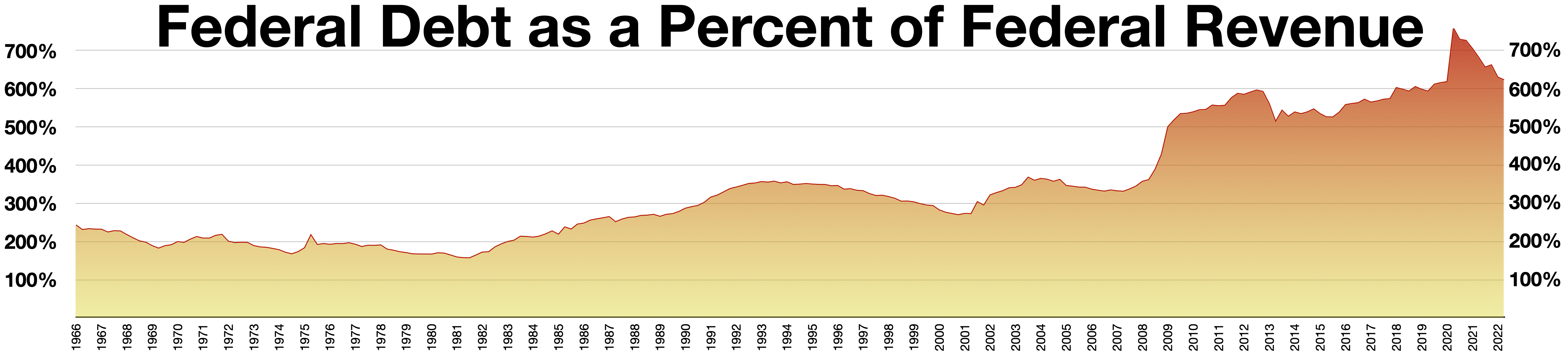
The financial ratio of federal debt to federal revenue from 1996 through 2022

The budget document often begins with the president's proposal to Congress recommending funding levels for the next fiscal year, beginning October 1 and ending on September 30 of the year following. The fiscal year refers to the year in which it ends.

For fiscal year (FY) 2018, the federal government spent $4.11 trillion. Spending equaled 20.3% of gross domestic product (GDP), equal to the 50-year average. The deficit equaled $779 billion, 3.8 percent of GDP. Tax revenue amounted to $3.33 trillion, with receipt categories including individual income taxes ($1,684B or 51%), Social Security/Social Insurance taxes ($1,171B or 35%), and corporate taxes ($205B or 6%).

== Employees ==
The United States federal government had about 2,260,000 civilian employees in FY2023, with about 160,000 of those in the District of Columbia (not counting the United States Postal Service).

== Elections and voting ==
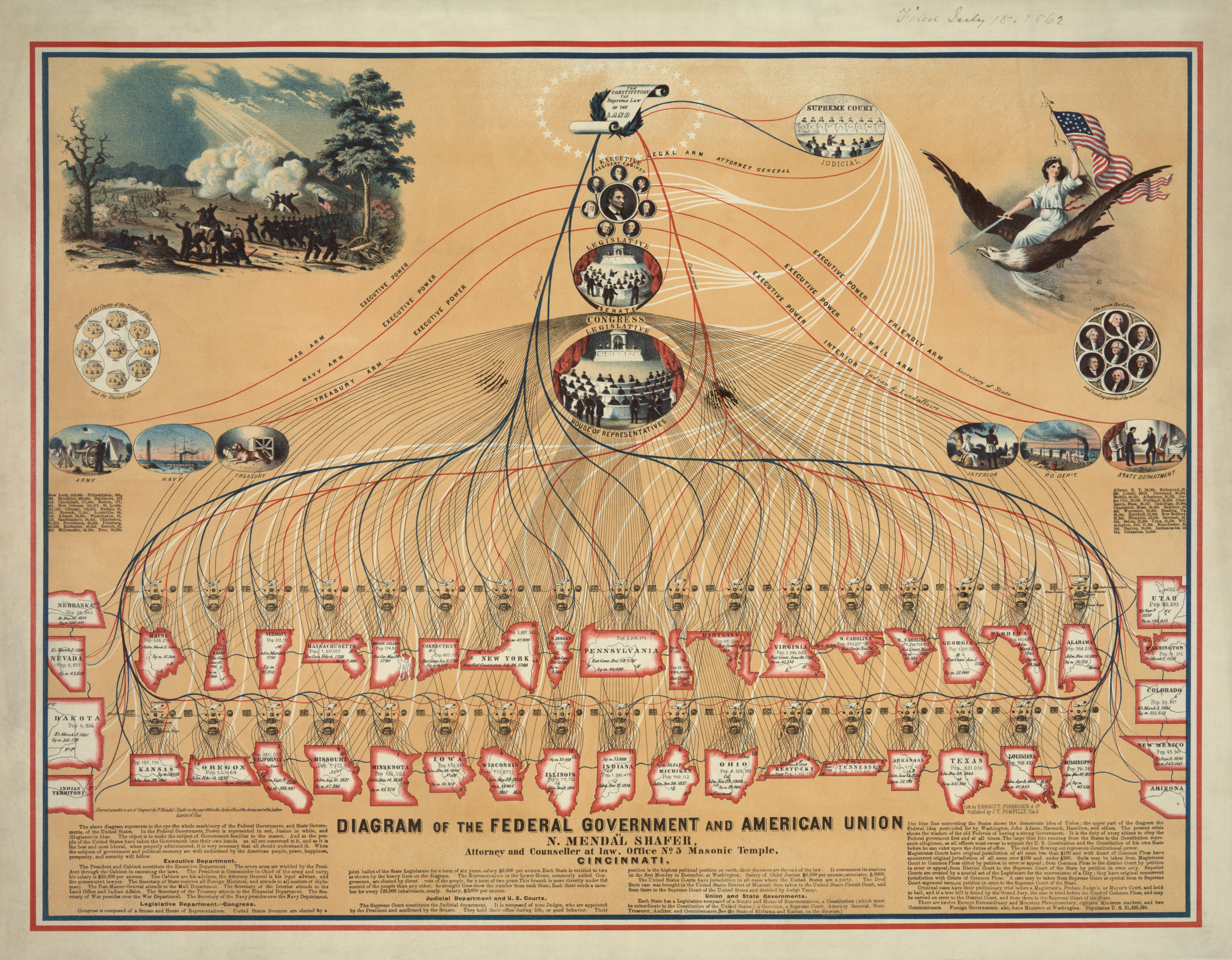
Diagram of the Federal Government and American Union in 1862

Suffrage, known as the ability to vote, has changed significantly over time. In the early years of the United States, voting was considered a matter for state governments, and was commonly restricted to white men who owned land. Direct elections were mostly held only for the U.S. House of Representatives and state legislatures, although what specific bodies were elected by the electorate varied from state to state. Under this original system, both senators representing each state in the U.S. Senate were chosen by a majority vote of the state legislature. Since the ratification of the Seventeenth Amendment in 1913, members of both houses of Congress have been directly elected. Today, U.S. citizens have almost universal suffrage under equal protection of the laws from the age of 18, regardless of race, gender, or wealth. The only significant exception to this is the disenfranchisement of convicted felons, and in some states former felons as well.

Under the U.S. Constitution, the representation of U.S. territories and the federal district of District of Columbia in Congress is limited: while residents of the District of Columbia are subject to federal laws and federal taxes, their only congressional representative is a non-voting delegate; however, they have participated in presidential elections since March 29, 1961.

Residents of Puerto Rico other than federal employees do not pay federal personal income taxes on income that has its source in Puerto Rico, and do not pay most federal excise taxes (for example, the federal gasoline tax); however, Puerto Ricans pay all other federal taxes, including the federal payroll taxes that fund Social Security and Medicare; the FUTA tax; and business, gift, and estate taxes. Puerto Rico is represented in the Congress by a nonvoting delegate, the Resident Commissioner.

== State, tribal, and local governments ==
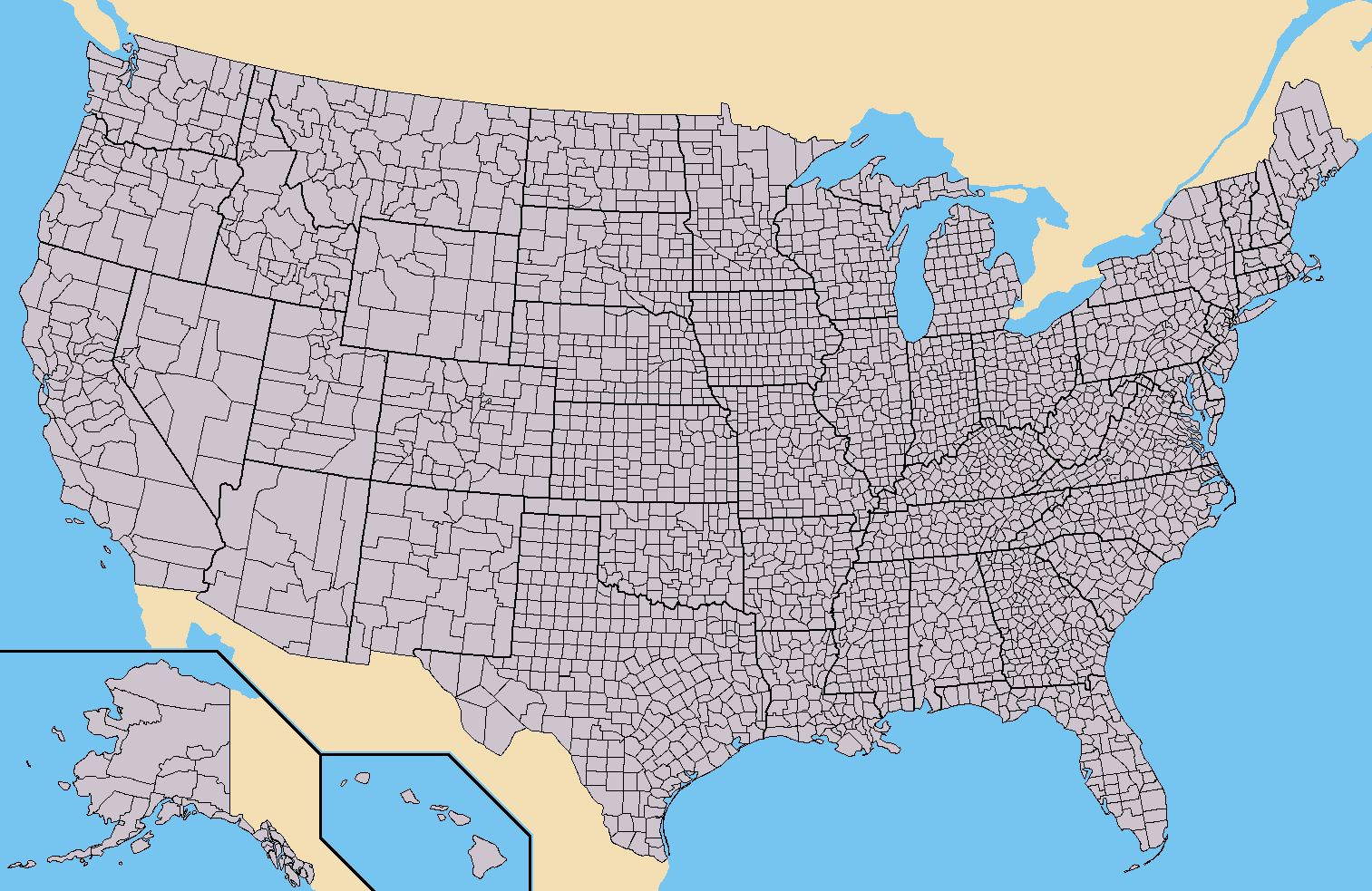
The states of the United States as divided into counties (or, in Louisiana and Alaska, parishes and boroughs, respectively). Alaska and Hawaii are not to scale and the Aleutian and uninhabited Northwestern Hawaiian Islands have been omitted.

State governments have the greatest influence over most Americans' daily lives. The Tenth Amendment prohibits the federal government from exercising any power not delegated to it by the Constitution; as a result, states handle the majority of issues most relevant to individuals within their jurisdiction. Because state governments are not authorized to print currency, they generally have to raise revenue through either taxes or bonds. As a result, state governments tend to impose severe budget cuts or raise taxes any time the economy is faltering.

Each state has its own written constitution, government, and code of laws. The Constitution stipulates only that each state must have, "a Republican Government". Therefore, there are often great differences in law and procedure between individual states, concerning issues such as property, crime, health and education, amongst others. The highest elected official of each state is the governor, and in 45 states, a lieutenant governor serves below that position, and is next in the line of succession.

Each state also has an elected state legislature (bicameralism is a feature of every state except Nebraska), whose members represent the voters of the state. Each state maintains its own state court system. In some states, supreme and lower court justices are elected by the people; in others, they are appointed, as they are in the federal system.

As a result of the Supreme Court case Worcester v. Georgia, American Indian tribes are considered "domestic dependent nations" that operate as sovereign governments subject to federal authority but, in some cases, outside of the jurisdiction of state governments. Hundreds of laws, executive orders and court cases have modified the governmental status of tribes vis-à-vis individual states, but the two have continued to be recognized as separate bodies. Tribal governments vary in robustness, from a simple council used to manage all aspects of tribal affairs, to large and complex bureaucracies with several branches of government. Tribes are currently encouraged to form their own governments, with power resting in elected tribal councils, elected tribal chairpersons, or religiously appointed leaders (as is the case with pueblos). Tribal citizenship and voting rights are typically restricted to individuals of native descent, but tribes are free to set whatever citizenship requirements they wish.

The institutions that are responsible for local government within states are typically counties, municipalities, and special-purpose districts, which make laws that affect their particular area. These laws concern issues such as traffic, the sale of alcohol and the keeping of animals. A county is an administrative or political subdivision of a state, while Louisiana and Alaska have county-equivalent subdivisions called parishes and boroughs, respectively. The specific governmental powers of counties vary widely between the states, with those in Connecticut, Rhode Island, and some parts of Alaska and Massachusetts having little or no power, existing only as geographic distinctions. In other areas, county governments have more power, such as to collect taxes and maintain law enforcement agencies. Twenty states further divide their counties into civil townships. Population centers may be organized into incorporated municipalities of several types, including the city, town, borough, and village. These municipal entities also vary from state to state, and typically subordinate to the government of a county or civil township. However, many rural and suburban regions are in unincorporated areas that have no municipal government below the county or civil township level. Certain cities have consolidated with their county government to form consolidated city-counties, or have been legally separated from counties altogether to form independent cities. States may also create special-purpose districts that perform a single function or a set of related functions within an area inside one or more counties or municipalities, like school districts, water management districts, fire management districts, and library districts.

== See also ==
=== President ===
- Executive Office
- Line-item veto

=== Courts ===
- District courts
- Federal courts
- Federal judicial circuit

=== Law ===
- U.S. Code

=== Agencies ===
- Federal agencies

=== States and territories ===
- Political divisions
- U.S. territory

=== Works and websites ===
- Business.gov
- Copyright status of work by the U.S. government
- USA.gov

- Criticism of the United States government
