= Federal Information Security Modernization Act of 2014 =

United States federal law

- Long title: An Act to amend chapter 35 of title 44, United States Code, to provide for reform to Federal information security.
- Acronyms (colloquial): FISMA2014
- Nicknames: FISMA Reform
- Enacted by: the 113th United States Congress
- Effective: December 18, 2014

Citations
- Public law: 113-283
- Statutes at Large: 128 Stat. 3073 aka 128 Stat. 3073

Codification
- Acts amended: Federal Information Security Management Act of 2002
- Titles amended: 44 U.S.C.: Public Printing and Documents
- U.S.C. sections created: 44 U.S.C. ch. 35, subch. II § 3551 et seq.
- U.S.C. sections amended: 44 U.S.C. ch. 35, subch. II § 3501 et seq.; 44 U.S.C. ch. 35, subch. III § 3541 et seq.

Legislative history
- Introduced in the House as S. 2521 by Thomas Carper (D–DE) on June 24, 2014; Committee consideration by Senate Homeland Security and Governmental Affairs; Passed the Senate on December 8, 2014 (passed unanimous consent); Passed the House on December 10, 2014 (passed without objection); Signed into law by President Barack Obama on December 18, 2014

The Federal Information Security Modernization Act of 2014 (Pub.L. 113-283, S. 2521; commonly referred to as FISMA Reform) was signed into federal law by President Barack Obama on December 18, 2014. Passed as a response to the increasing amount of cyber attacks on the federal government, it amended existing laws to enable the federal government to better respond to cyber attacks on departments and agencies. Amended laws included the Federal Information Security Management Act of 2002.

An earlier version of the legislation was proposed by House Oversight and Government Reform Chairman Darrell Issa and co-sponsored by the Committee's Ranking Member Elijah Cummings as H.R.1163 Federal Information Security Amendments Act of 2013. The bill was passed by the U.S. House of Representatives on a vote of 416–0.

The final version of the legislation was introduced to the United States Senate Committee on Homeland Security and Governmental Affairs by Thomas Carper (D–DE) on June 24, 2014 and passed December 8, 2014 in the Senate and December 10, 2014 in the House.
