= Cyber risk quantification =

Risk assessment

Cyber risk quantification involves the application of risk quantification techniques to an organization's cybersecurity risk. Cyber risk quantification is the process of evaluating the cyber risks that have been identified and then validating, measuring and analyzing the available cyber data using mathematical modeling techniques to accurately represent the organization's cybersecurity environment in a manner that can be used to make informed cybersecurity infrastructure investment and risk transfer decisions. Cyber risk quantification is a supporting activity to cybersecurity risk management; cybersecurity risk management is a component of enterprise risk management and is especially important in organizations and enterprises that are highly dependent upon their information technology (IT) networks and systems for their business operations.

One method of quantifying cyber risk is the value-at-risk (VaR) method that is discussed at the January 2015 World Economic Forum meeting. At this meeting, VaR was studied and researched and deemed to be a viable method of quantifying cyber risk.

== Applications ==
Cyber risk quantification has been used in practical applications including cyber insurance, cybersecurity return on investment, software mitigation costs, and cybersecurity risk assessments.

Security ratings are a measurement of an organization's cybersecurity effectiveness. There are a number of companies that provide security rating services. Security ratings provide businesses and government agencies with an independent view into the security behaviors and practices of their own organization and business partners.

== See also ==
- Center for Internet Security
- Factor analysis of information risk
- Gordon–Loeb model
- ISO/IEC 27001
- ISO/IEC 27002
- NIST Cybersecurity Framework
