= Master of Science in Information Assurance =

Type of graduate degree

A Master of Science in Information Assurance (abbreviated MSIA) is a type of postgraduate academic master's degree awarded by universities in many countries. This degree is typically studied for in information assurance.

== Curriculum Structure ==
The Master of Science in Information Assurance is a one to three years Master Degree; depending on the program, some may even start with two-year preparation classes and covers various areas of computer science, Internet security, Computer security, and or cyber security.

Topics of study may include:

- Business continuity planning
- CobiT
- Countermeasure (computer)
- Disaster recovery
- Factor Analysis of Information Risk
- Fair information practice
- Forensic science
- Information security
- ISO 17799
- ISO/IEC 27002
- IT risk management
- Long-term support
- Management science
- Mission assurance
- PCI DSS
- Regulatory compliance
- Risk assessment
- Risk IT
- Risk factor (computing)
- Risk management
- Security controls
- Security engineering
- Systems engineering
- Threat
- Vulnerability

== Institutions with MSIA Degree Programs ==
Institutions in the United States that have a Master of Science in Information Assurance degree program include:

- Capitol Technology University
- Dakota State University
- Florida Institute of Technology
- Georgia Institute of Technology
- Iowa State University
- Johns Hopkins University
- Northeastern University
- Norwich University
- Oklahoma State University
- Regis University
- Robert Morris University
- St. Cloud State University
- University of Alabama Huntsville
- Western Governors University
- Wilmington University, New Castle Delaware

== See also ==
- List of master's degrees
- Committee on National Security Systems
- ISACA
- National Information Assurance Training and Education Center
- Standards Organizations and Standards
