= Jelena Zelenovic Matone =

Jelena Zelenović Matone
- Education: MBA, University of Toronto, IT, York University
- Occupation: Chief Information Security Officer
- Website: jelenamatone.com

Jelena Z. Matone is an Italian-Canadian information security specialist and advocate for women's empowerment in technology. She is best known for her role as the CISO of European Investment Bank and Founding Board Member and the first president of the Women Cyber Force & Women 4 Cyber (W4C) chapter, a global initiative aimed at promoting cybersecurity awareness, education, and gender equality in the industry.

== Early life and education ==
Matone was born in Mostar, Bosnia and Herzegovina. Jelena spent part of her childhood in Belgrade, before relocating as a teenager to Toronto, Canada, where she grew up.

In 2005, she earned an Honours degree in Information Technology from York University (Toronto), and in 2011, she obtained her Executive MBA from the University of Toronto.

She is certified as a CISA (Certified Information Systems Auditor, c. 2009) and CRISC (Certified in Risk and Information Systems Control, c. 2018) through ISACA.

== Infosecurity career ==
Matone began her infosecurity journey in Toronto in the early 2000s, starting as an IT consultant and SOX compliance specialist at CGI, progressing to roles at Nortel in SOX prime and SOX audit, before moving into IT audit at George Weston Ltd and then Sobeys, where she handled audit, regulatory compliance, M&A strategy, and IT risk management.

=== European Stability Mechanism ===
From May 2014 to January 2018, Matone served as senior lead for IT security at the European Stability Mechanism (ESM) in Luxembourg. In this role, she supported the development of the institution's IT vision, strategy, and operating model. She was responsible for building the institution's first line of defense in IT security, serving as its first IT security lead. She led the development of operational cybersecurity controls and risk mitigation practices during the period when the ESM was establishing its foundational digital infrastructure. She later transitioned into a second-line position, focusing on risk governance, oversight, and security leadership.

In January 2018, she was appointed senior manager for operational risk and information security officer (ISO), a position she held until September 2019. In this role, she was responsible for leading the identification, assessment, monitoring, and reporting of high-risk operational processes. She also contributed to the development of the operational risk framework, policy, measurement methodologies, and internal guidelines, in alignment with the organisational needs.

=== European Investment Bank ===
In September 2019, Matone was appointed Chief Information Security Officer (CISO) at the European Investment Bank (EIB). In this senior leadership role, she is responsible for cybersecurity risk management, the development and enforcement of security policies, operational security, audit and compliance, governance, and continuous improvement of the bank's information security framework.

She is quoted in the book ESM as "pioneer of IT".

== Gender equity and mentorship ==
Matone has supported gender equity and professional development in the cybersecurity field. She participated in the Mentoring for Advancing Women Stream, an initiative designed to support the advancement of women in cybersecurity, risk, and technology leadership roles across institutions. Through mentorship, networking, and career development activities, the program aims to empower emerging female leaders in traditionally male-dominated sectors. She is also a mentor for York University students.

== Advisory and board positions ==
- Advisory Board Member, Cyber Artificial Intelligence Operation Capability (CAIOC) – Appointed in August 2024
- Alternate Board Member, Internal Infrastructure Coordination Board (IICB), European Commission – Since June 2024
- Member, Cyber Crime, Cyber Skills, Cybersecurity and AI Group, World Economic Forum – Appointed in November 2023
- Founding Board Member and Founding President, Women Cyber Force – Since December 2020
- Member of the Inter-Institutional Cybersecurity Board (IICB)

== Selected Publications ==
Matone contributes articles in Cybersecurity Trends magazine (Italian edition).

- "The Urgent Need for Post-Quantum Cryptography (PQC) Migration"
- "The Urgent Necessity for Migration to PQC"
- "Quantum Computing: The Most Mysterious of Scientific Theories"
- "Regulatory Changes: When Breaking Bad Is Good"
- "DDoS Attacks"
- "DORA Regulation"
- "Understanding Ransomware: Threats, Prevention, and Recovery"
- "Protecting the Global Supply Chain: Cyber Risks, Incidents, and Mitigation Measures"
- "A Hybrid Approach Between Cyber Requirements and the TIBER-EU Framework"
- "Compliance: A Challenge for Organisations"

== Awards and recognition ==
Notable Awards and Honor
Year	Award	Presented by	Notes
2025	Top 100 CISOs in the World	CSO Online or relevant industry publication	International recognition of leading global CISOs
2021	Ambassador of the Year (Cybersecurity)	POST Luxembourg and EBRC	Awarded during Cybersecurity Week Luxembourg for advocacy in cybersecurity awareness and inclusion
2020	Sentinel CISO Global	SentinelOne (or relevant organizing body)	Global recognition for cybersecurity leadership
2020	EU CISO of the Year	EU cybersecurity initiative or relevant body	Recognized for contributions to EU-wide cybersecurity strategy
2019	CISO of the Year (Luxembourg)	Luxembourg cybersecurity community	Awarded for excellence in information security leadership
