= NS2 =

NS2 may refer to:

== Transportation ==
- Bukit Batok MRT station, Singapore, station code NS2
- Kinunobebashi Station, Kawanishi, Japan, station code NS02
- Tetsudō-Hakubutsukan Station, Ōmiya-ku, Japan, station code NS02
- NS2, a British NS class airship
- NS2, a New Shepard, a reusable sub-orbital launch vehicle

== Other uses ==
- ns (simulator) version ns-2, computer network simulation software
- Natural Selection 2, a video game
- Nintendo Switch 2, a hybrid video game console and handheld
- Nord Stream 2, natural gas pipeline from Russia to Germany
- Novelty seeking level 2, impulsiveness
- Hepatitis C virus nonstructural protein 2, a viral protein

== See also ==
- NSS (disambiguation)
- NS (disambiguation)
- 2 (disambiguation)
