= National Security Presidential Memorandum 12 =

National Security Presidential Memorandum 12 (NSPM-12), signed on June 12, 2026, by President Donald Trump, rebuilt the framework to secure America's National Security Systems (NSS). It rescinded the two main pillars that previously established it, National Security Directive 42 and National Security Memorandum 8, keeping the core components but adding more accountability and enforceability.

== Core components ==
- The Committee on National Security Systems (CNSS) was reestablished but consolidated. Now chaired by a representative of the National Security Council, only 4 members can vote: the CIO of the Department of War, the CIO of the Director of National Intelligence, the federal CIO of the Office of Management and Budget, and the Director of the National Security Agency. The other chairs from the older form still have seats, but are only advisors and can no longer vote.
- The National Manager of NSS, the Director of the NSA, is directly empowered to issue binding emergency directives (similar to CISA's ability for normal government systems), provide standards for cryptography, and direct technical solutions for cross-domain solutions. Previously the National Manager was more of a technical advisor role, but now holds "the full technical power of the National Security Agency to provide advanced defenses and assistance in order to bolster the security of NSS across the U.S. government."
- A Policy Coordination Committee (PCC) is established within the National Security Council to track compliance and baselines throughout the United States government. The PCC can also request the National Manager to audit specific NSS cybersecurity posture and compliance and report the results.
- Heads of departments and agencies can be held legally accountable for failing to comply with standards or directives.
- Voluntary guidelines become mandatory. National Institute of Standards and Technology guidelines become minimum requirements if CNSS guidance on a particular cybersecurity topic doesn't exist. Every agency must now have a baseline of NSS updated annually.

== Minor requirements ==
- CNSS 900 must be updated (the governing and operating procedures of the CNSS)
- Priority cybersecurity areas must be published
- Older policies and guidelines must be removed
- CNNSP-32 (cloud security) must be updated
