= Corey Schou =

Corey Schou is University Professor of Informatics and Associate Dean at Idaho State University, director of the National Information Assurance Training and Education Center (NIATEC) and the Simplot Decision Support Center (SDSC), and for ten years the chair of the Colloquium for Information Systems Security Education (CISSE).

In the early 1980s, organizations began to recognize that connected PCs in various locations were much more vulnerable than a mainframe locked away in a single building. These organizations began seeking qualified individuals responsible for selecting, recommending and implementing security policy and procedures. However, few schools were offering information security curricula, much less academic degrees, and organizations would have to take an IT professional at his or her word that they knew how to manage information security for the entire enterprise.

By 1989 Schou and others had established a unified common Body of knowledge for computer security. Schou, with Idaho State University hosted the finalization meetings in Salt Lake City. His work was later recognized by the organization with various awards in San Francisco (Founder's award and The need for a professional certification to maintain and validate a common knowledge, values, and ethics for individuals in the industry became a growing concern. Several IT professional societies recognized that a certification program attesting to the qualifications of information security personnel was needed.

Schou's work is recognized several organizations such as ISC2 as foundational to the Information Assurance discipline in academia. His work for three decades has resulted in standards used internationally by government, industry and academia.

== Teaching ==
Schou is a teacher and mentor whose style is described by his students and colleagues as Socratic. At all levels he encourages students to excel. Although he has had a full-service and research agenda, university records show that he has taught at least one class every semester for the past 30 years.

He currently heads one of the Scholarship for Service Cyber Corps programs that prepares individuals to be Information Assurance Professionals. In this program all students take a full MBA program. In addition they are exposed to both courses and practicum experiences. Upon completion of the program the graduates have completed all the requirements for certification by the Committee on National Security Systems. The program is one of only three in the nation that is certified at all levels for all certifications CAE. In addition, graduates are expected to sit for the Systems Security Certified Practitioner SSCP and CISSP examinations from (ISC)2. Currently the program has a 100% pass rate on the first try as documented in the university annual report to the National Science Foundation NSF.

In 1993 he was the first non-government employee to be recognized as Educator of the Year by the Federal Information Systems Security Educators Association FISSEA

== Writing ==
He is the author of several books on information assurance called Information Assurance for the Enterprise: A Roadmap to Information Security McGraw Hill Catalog. and over 300 referred papers and monographs.

Recent Research Books

- Schou, C., Lohse, E. (2009). The Crabtree Files, The assembled works and papers of Crabtree and Swanson. Idaho: Idaho Museum of Natural History, IRI.
- Corey D., Shoemaker, Daniel; Information Assurance for the Enterprise: A Roadmap to Information Security, McGraw Hill, January 2007
- Schou, Corey D., Kuhel, D., “Information Operations Education: Lessons Learned from Information Assurance”, Information Warfare Separating Hype from Reality, Edited by Edwin L. Armistead, Potomac Books, Washington DC, 2007 Book Chapter
- Lohse, S., Schou, C., (2007)The Columbia Plateau-Snake River Region Cultural Sequence. In Projectile Point Sequences in Northwestern North America, edited by Roy Carlson and Marty Magne. Canadian Archaeological Association. Book Chapter

Refereed Journal Articles

- Schou, C., Armistead, E. L., Ryan, J. (2009/10). International Academic Standards: A New Approach to Information Operations for Interoperability. Journal of Information Warfare.
- Schou, C., et al. (2009/2010) Developing information assurance standards, ACM SIGCSE Bulletin Volume 41, Issue 4 (December 2009), Year of Publication: 2010, ISSN 0097-8418
- Trimmer, K., Parker, K. R., Schou, C. (2009). Functional Requirements for Secure Code: The Reference Monitor and Use Case. Academy of Information and Management Sciences Journal, 12(2), 113-119.
- Trimmer, K., Parker, K. R., Schou, C. (2007). Forcing Early Implementation of Information Assurance Precepts Throughout the Design Phase. Journal of Informatics Education Research, 9(1), 95-120.
- Frost, James, Schou, Corey, The Missing Components of the Security Audit - A Case Study, in The Challenge of Managing System Integrity, 2006, ISBN 0-9772107-2-3.
