= U.S. Army Information Technology Agency =

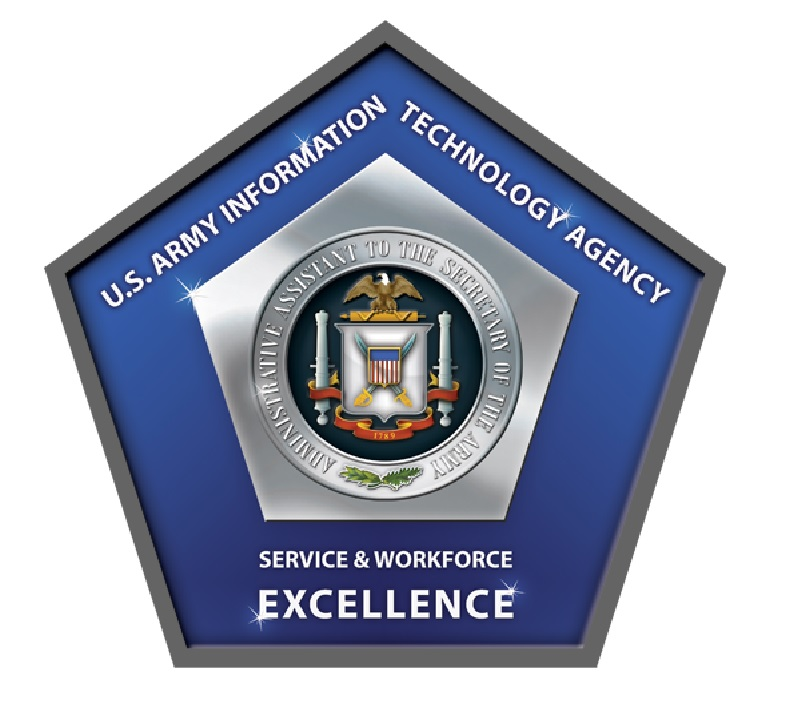
- Logo of ITA
- Active: 1995–present
- Country: United States
- Branch: Army
- Type: Information technology
- Garrison/HQ: Arlington, Virginia

Commanders
- Executive Director ITA: Gregory Garcia
- Deputy Executive Director: William J. Cunningham, Jr.

The United States Army Information Technology Agency (ITA) is one of the administrative service organizations aligned under the Office of the Administrative Assistant to the Secretary of the Army (OAA). OAA has three fundamental functions. The primary mission of the organization is to provide direct support to the Secretary of the Army and other Army political appointees. The second mission is to provide administrative support to the Headquarters, Department of the Army (HQDA). The third mission is to provide base operations support to a diverse group of Army and Department of Defense (DoD) customers. OAA is organized into four major divisions: the U.S. Army Resources and Programs Agency (RPA), the U.S. Army Headquarters Services (AHS), the U.S. Army Information Technology Agency (ITA), and the U.S. Army Center of Military History (CMH). These divisions support OAA primarily in areas of IT, logistics, training, and human resources support.

== History ==
ITA has been active since 1995. With the signing of Department of Defense (DoD) Directive 8220.1 in 1995, the Deputy Secretary of Defense John P. White charged the Secretary of the Army Togo D. West Jr. with responsibility for establishing a Single Agency Manager (SAM) to provide Pentagon Information Technology Services for the National Defense community. As stated in the DoD policy, the SAM was to be the central source for IT services, and therefore, eliminated the requirement for each DoD component to establish, operate, and maintain duplicative technologies. The policy also directed the SAM to explicitly manage costs, as the directive outlined the responsibility to operate as a business, and continually evaluate new commercial alternatives to find cost savings. Since the inception of the SAM, several organizational changes and major events have impacted its course. The organization's name was changed to its current name, United States Army Information Technology Agency, in 2003. In addition to the name change, ITA evolved from a field operating agency under the operational control of the Office of the Administrative Assistant to the Secretary of the Army (OAA) where it remains today.

One impetus of change has been the ongoing renovation of the Pentagon and its IT infrastructure. The Pentagon Renovation Program (PENREN) is charged with overseeing the 14-year, multi-phase renovation and construction project. Working jointly with PENREN, ITA is implementing a new IT infrastructure along with storage and data processing services at the Pentagon. The new infrastructure modernizes, integrates, and consolidates many of the older, duplicative systems, capabilities, and facilities previously operated and maintained by separate organizations. Additionally, the updated storage and data processing services provide higher levels of capacity, performance and reliability through virtualization and replication.

Major national events have also compelled ITA to transform. The September 11, 2001 attack on the Pentagon demonstrated that in order to survive, IT systems needed to be redundant and data had to be easily relocated. To achieve a survivable architecture, the new Pentagon infrastructure includes state-of-the-art telecommunications network and facilities. Riding on top of this new infrastructure are redundant, switched storage networks and high density virtualization platforms supported by a redundant Information Lifecycle Management (ILM) architecture.

June 3, 2015 U.S. Army ITA, OSD Enterprise Information Technology Service Division (EITSD) and some smaller IT service providers merged to become the Joint Service Provider - Pentagon organization under DISA.

== Organizational structure ==
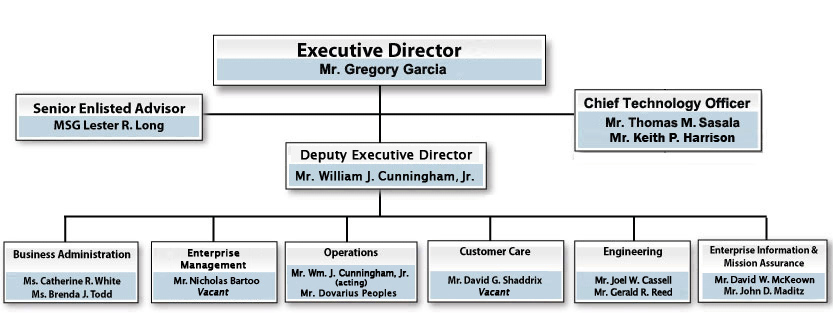
ITA organization chart

ITA is a multifunctional support services organization that provides a broad range of information and communications technology to the HQDA, select DoD elements, and other Federal entities located within the National Capital Region (NCR). This includes providing Army personnel with desktop, network, security, and telecommunications support.

To provide enhanced IT support to its customers and increase internal operating efficiency, ITA initiated a transformation effort to functionally align the organization. As a result, ITA is organized into six functional areas: Business Administration, Customer Care, Engineering, Enterprise Information & Mission Assurance, Enterprise Management, and Operations. The Business Administration Directorate ensures the daily functioning of ITA. Customer Care includes all functions that have regular customer contact, including account management and service desk management. The Engineering Directorate includes all functions associated with the design and development of new services and systems. Enterprise Information & Mission Assurance supports the operational, physical and information security of ITA. Enterprise Management includes all functions required to plan and monitor the overall ITA organization. Lastly, the Operations Directorate supports currently deployed systems and services.
