= NSS =

NSS may refer to:

== Arts and entertainment ==
- New Star Soccer, a computer game
- Nintendo Switch Sports, a 2022 video game
- Newsstand Specials, a spinoff of Playboy magazine
- Nintendo Super System, an arcade game cabinet that plays Super NES games
- Northern Sound System, a youth music education centre and venue in Adelaide, South Australia
- NSS, a 1958 computer chess program

== Organizations ==
=== Government bodies ===
- National Security Secretariat (United Kingdom), part of the Cabinet Office
- National Security Service (disambiguation), the name of several intelligence services
- National Seismological Service, an agency of the Mexican government
- National Service Scheme, a Government of India-sponsored program for community service and social activities
- National Statistical Service of the Republic of Armenia, former name of the Statistical Committee of Armenia
- NHS National Services Scotland, the central support agency to the NHS in Scotland

=== Political parties ===
- People's Socialist Party of Montenegro, a political party in the Republic of Montenegro
- National Power Unity, a far-right party in Latvia
- People's Peasant Party (Narodna seljačka stranka), a political party in Serbia

=== Schools ===
- National Sport School (Canada), a high school in Alberta, Canada
- Nauru Secondary School, a high school in Nauru
- National Socialist Schoolchildren's League (Nationalsozialistischer Schülerbund), the organization for school pupils in the Third Reich
- Northbrooks Secondary School, a secondary school in Yishun, Singapore
- Northern Secondary School, a high school in Toronto, Canada

=== Companies ===
- National Screen Service, an American company involved in cinema advertising
- New Skies Satellites, the former name of the Dutch spacecraft operator
- Norsk Spisevognselskap, a dining car company of Norway
- Northern Steamship Company, a New Zealand shipping company

=== Other organizations ===
- Nair Service Society, a community welfare organization for the Nair community from Kerala, India
- National Space Society, an international space advocacy organization
- National Sculpture Society, US
- National Secular Society, a British organization
- National Speleological Society, an American organization
- Nilachala Saraswata Sangha, a religious organization
- National Service Scheme, Indian government-sponsored public service programme

== Politics and government ==
- National Security Strategy (United States)
- National Shelter System, a database of emergency shelters in the US administered by the Federal Emergency Management Agency
- National Shipbuilding Strategy, a Government of Canada procurement program
- National Student Survey, a survey of final-year degree students in the UK
- Nuclear Security Summit, a summit on nuclear security established by US President Obama

== Science and technology ==
=== Computing ===
- National Security System, a kind of US government information and telecommunication systems
- Name Service Switch, a technology used in UNIX
- Namespace Specific String, a part of the syntax of a Uniform Resource Name
- Network Security Services, cryptographic software libraries first developed at Netscape for client and server security
- Network switching subsystem, a component of the mobile-phone network
- Novell Storage Services, a file system used by the Novell NetWare operating system
- NSS, a 1958 computer chess program

=== Other uses in science and technology ===
- Neurological soft signs, signs of disturbance in neurology
- Neutral salt spray, a salt spray test to qualify the corrosion resistance of coatings on metal
- Normal saline solution, in medicine
- NSS Annapolis, a US Navy VLF and HF radio transmitter site in Annapolis, Maryland

== Other uses ==
- Nostalgia Super Stock, a drag racing class

== See also ==
- NS (disambiguation)
