= McCumber =

McCumber is a surname. Notable people with the surname include:

- Kevin McCumber (born 1979), American government official
- Mark McCumber (born 1951), American golfer
- Porter J. McCumber (1858–1933), American politician

== See also ==
- Lester McCumbers (1921–2015), American fiddler
- Fordney–McCumber Tariff
- McCumber cube
- McCumber relation
