= Certified penetration testing engineer =

Cyber security certification

Certified Penetration Testing Engineer (C)PTE) is an internationally recognized cyber security certification administered by the United States–based information security company Mile2. The accreditation maps to the Committee on National Security Systems' 4013 education certification. The C)PTE certification is considered one of five core cyber security certifications.

== Accreditations ==
Obtaining the C)PTE certification requires proven proficiency and knowledge of five key information security elements, penetration testing, data collection, scanning, enumeration, exploitation and reporting.

The CPTE certification is one of some information assurance accreditations recognized by the U.S. National Security Agency. The certification has also been approved by the U.S. Department of Homeland Security's National Initiative for Cybersecurity Studies and Careers (NICSS) and the U.S.-based National Security Systems Committee.

== Examination ==
The online exam for C)PTE accreditation lasts two hours and consists of 100 multiple choice questions.
