= Federal Chief Information Security Officer =

United States federal officer

The office of the Federal Chief Information Security Officer of the United States (CISO) was created on September 8 2016. The role of the CISO is to guide cybersecurity policy, planning, and implementation in the U.S. Federal Government. The first appointment to this position was Gregory Touhill, who stepped down in January 2017. He was replaced by Grant Schneider (formerly the Deputy CISO). Chris DeRusha was appointed in January 2021. The CISO position is in the Office of Management and Budget reporting to the U.S. Chief Information Officer. An acting deputy reports to the CISO.
