= National Information Assurance Training and Education Center =

Consortium of schools in the United States

The National Information Assurance Training and Education Center (NIATEC) is an American consortium of academic, industry, and government organizations to improve the literacy, awareness, training and education standards in Information Assurance. It serves to develop professionals with IA expertise in various disciplines and ultimately contributes to the protection of the National Information Infrastructure.

== Association ==
NIATEC is associated with Idaho State University, a National Security Agency Center of Academic Excellence in Information Assurance Education. The Centers of Academic Excellence and NIATEC are components of a plan to establish a federal cyber corps to defend against cyber-based disruption and attacks.

== Activities ==
NIATEC has been active in the development of training standards associated with both the National Institute of Standards and Technology Special Publication 800-16 and Committee on National Security Systems Instructions 4011, 4012, 4013, 4014, 4015, and 4016.

Dr. Corey Schou is the director of NIATEC. Dr. James Frost is the associate director. The group subscribes to the (ISC)² Code of Ethics.
