= Gregory Touhill =

American general

Greg (Gregory) Touhill
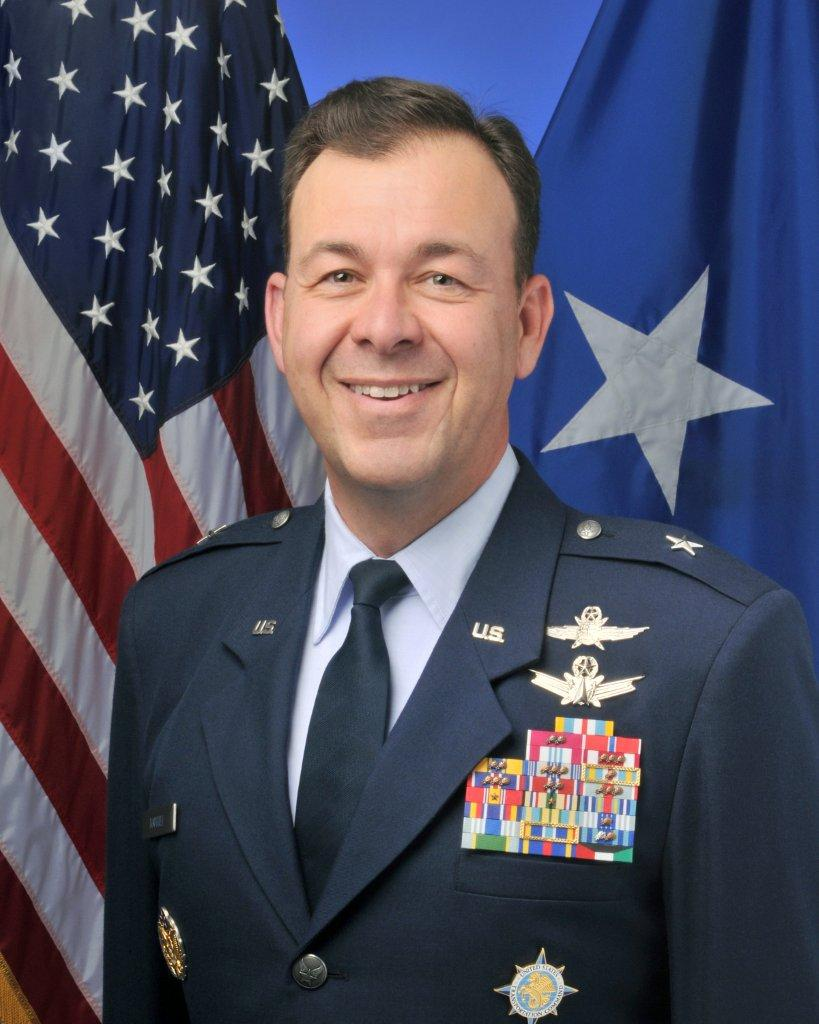
- 1st Chief Information Security Officer (2016-2017)
- Military career
- Service years: 1983-Present
- Rank: Brigadier General
- Nickname: Greg
- Conflicts: Desert Storm-OSW, Afghanistan, OIF

Brigadier General Gregory (Greg) J. Touhill is Director of the Carnegie Mellon University Software Engineering Institute’s CERT Division. Previously, he was the president of AppGate Federal Group (previously Cyxtera Federal Group). He was previously appointed by President Barack Obama as the first Federal Chief Information Security Officer of the United States, stepping down in January, 2017. He was previously the Deputy Assistant Secretary, Office of Cybersecurity and Communications, National Programs and Protection Directorate, Department of Homeland Security. While at DHS he concurrently served as Director of the National Cybersecurity and Communications Integration Center (NCCIC) during 2014–2015.

In his last military assignment, he was Chief Information Officer and Director of Command, Control, Communications, and Cyber Systems at U.S. Transportation Command. While there, his unit received the National Security Agency's Rowlett Award for the best Cybersecurity program in the US government.

He authored a book in 2014 called "Cybersecurity for Executives". In 2007 he co-authored Commercialization of Innovative Technologies. Both books are published by John Wiley and Sons.

General Touhill maintains the Certified Information Systems Security Professional (CISSP) and Certified Information Security Manager (CISM) professional Cybersecurity certifications. He also serves as an ISACA Board Director and is an adjunct professor at Carnegie Mellon University's Heinz College, instructing on Cyber Risk Management.

In addition to numerous military awards, including two awards of the Defense Superior Service Medal, three awards of the Legion of Merit, and the Bronze Star medal, General Touhill has been recognized with many professional awards. These include the 2022 Baldrige Leadership Award in cybersecurity, Security Magazine’s 2022 Top Cybersecurity Leaders, ISC2's 2017 F. Lynn McNulty Tribute Award and the 2016 GISLA Leadership Award, Security Magazine's Top 50 in Security, FedScoop's Cybersecurity Leadership Award, and the National Intelligence Meritorious Unit Citation.
