= National Shelter System =

The American Red Cross and the Federal Emergency Management Agency (FEMA) together developed the National Shelter System (NSS). Under the National Response Plan, now called the National Response Framework, the American Red Cross is the Co-Primary Agency with FEMA responsible for the Mass Care portion of Emergency Support Function #6 - Mass Care, Temporary Housing and Human Services.

The goal of the NSS is to be able to identify the location, managing agency, capacity, current population, needs assessment, and other relevant information for all shelters being run during the response to incidents.

== History ==
Then National Shelter System was developed in 2009 by FEMA and the American Red Cross as a web-based system that contains information on possible emergency shelter facilities. The goal of the NSS is to provide disaster relief groups with a planning and operational framework to disaster relief groups. Since it has become operational, access to the NSS has been offered to states that are now able to use it to plan for disaster relief. The NSS offers a directory of possible shelter locations and provides disaster relief managers with tools to help them help more people.
