= ISACA =

International professional association focused on IT

Information Systems Audit and Control Association
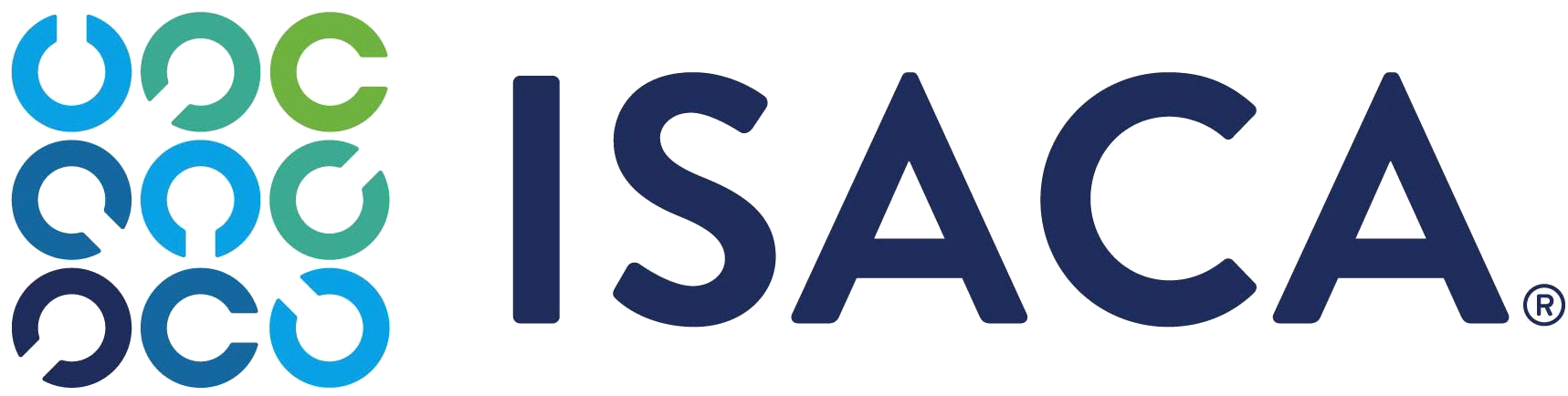
- Abbreviation: ISACA
- Formation: 1969
- Type: 501(c)(6)
- Tax ID no.: 23-7067291
- Purpose: To advance the pursuit of digital trust and the positive potential of technology.
- Headquarters: Schaumburg, Illinois, U.S
- Region served: Global
- Members: 169,000 (as of Dec 2022)
- Official language: English
- CEO: Erik Prusch
- Board Chair: John De Santis
- Revenue: $117.12 million (2024)
- Staff: 316 (FY2024)
- Website: www.isaca.org
- Formerly called: EDP Auditors Association

ISACA (formally known by the name Information Systems Audit and Control Association) is an American multinational professional association focused on information technology governance, auditing, risk management, and computer security (cybersecurity). Established in 1969, the organization develops frameworks and publishes guidance related to the management and oversight of information systems.

ISACA administers professional certification programs, including Certified Information Systems Auditor (CISA), Certified Information Security Manager (CISM), and Certified in Risk and Information Systems Control (CRISC). ISACA operates through a network of local chapters in multiple countries, its main headquarters is in Schaumburg, Illinois.

== History ==
ISACA originated in United States in 1967, when a group of individuals working on auditing controls in computer systems started to become increasingly critical of the operations of their organizations. They identified a need for a centralized source of information and guidance in the field. In 1969, Stuart Tyrnauer, an employee of the (later) Douglas Aircraft Company, incorporated the group as the EDP Auditors Association (EDPAA). Tyrnauer served as the body's founding chairman for the first three years. In 1976 the association formed an education foundation to undertake large-scale research efforts to expand the knowledge of and value accorded to the fields of governance and control of information technology.

The association became the Information Systems Audit and Control Association in 1994.

By 2008 the organization had dropped its long title and branded itself as ISACA.

In March 2016, ISACA bought the CMMI Institute, which is behind the Capability Maturity Model Integration.

In January 2020, ISACA updated and refreshed its look and digital presence, introducing a new logo.

== Current status ==
ISACA currently serves more than 185,000 constituents (members and professionals holding ISACA certifications) in more than 180 countries. The job titles of members are such as IS auditor, consultant, educator, IS security professional, regulator, chief information officer, chief information security officer and internal auditor. They work in nearly all industry categories. There is a network of ISACA chapters with more than 225 chapters established in over 180 countries. Chapters provide education, resource sharing, advocacy, networking and other benefits. There are more than 90 global student groups.

== Major publications ==
- COBIT ISACA Framework
- Frameworks, Standards and Models
  - Blockchain Framework and Guidance
  - Risk IT Framework
  - IT Audit Framework - (ITAF™): A Professional Practices Framework for IT Audit, 4th Edition
  - Business Model for Information Systems (BMIS)
  - Capability Maturity Model Integrated(CMMI)
- Information System Control Journal
- Insights and Expertise
  - Audit Programs and tools
  - Publications - over 200 professional publications and Guidance on Audit & Assurance, Emerging Technology, Governance, Information Security, Information Technology, Privacy, Risk. Some of the topics include:
    - Artificial Intelligence
    - Blockchain
    - Certification Exam Prep Guides for Certified Information Systems Auditor® (CISA®)CISA, AAIA, CISM, CRISC, CDPSE, CGEIT, CCOA, CSX-P and several Certificate Courses
    - Cloud Computing
    - COBIT
    - Compliance
    - Cybersecurity
    - Data Governance
    - Data Science
    - Internet of Things
    - Network Infrastructure
    - Software Development
    - Threats and Controls
    - Vendor Management
    - Young Professionals
- White Papers - Over 200 white papers on a range of contemporary topics
- News and Trends

== Certifications ==
- Certified Information Systems Auditor (CISA,1978)
- Certified Information Security Manager (CISM, 2002)
- Certified in the Governance of Enterprise IT (CGEIT, 2007)
- Certified in Risk and Information Systems Control (CRISC, 2010)
- Cybersecurity Practitioner Certification (CSX-P, 2015)
- Certified Data Privacy Solutions Engineer (CDPSE, 2020)
- Information Technology Certified Associate (ITCA, 2021)
- Certified in Emerging Technology (CET, 2021)
- Certified Cybersecurity Operations Analyst (CCOA, 2025)
- Advanced in AI Audit (AAIA, 2025)
- Advanced in AI Security Management (AAISM, 2025)

The CSX-P, ISACA's first cybersecurity certification, was introduced in the summer of 2015. It is one of the few certifications that require the individual to work in a live environment, with real problems, to obtain a certification. Specifically, the exam puts test takers in a live network with a real incident taking place. The student's efforts to respond to the incident and fix the problem results in the type of score awarded.

AAIA was introduced in 2025 for experienced, certified IT auditors and focuses on AI risk, assurance and audit frameworks.

AAISM was introduced in 2025 for experienced IT professionals to address AI-specific threats.

=== Certificates ===
- IT Audit Fundamentals Certificate
- IT Risk Fundamentals Certificate
- Certificate of Cloud Auditing Knowledge
- Cybersecurity Audit Certificate
- Computing Fundamentals Certificate
- Networks and Infrastructure Fundamentals Certificate
- Cybersecurity Fundamentals Certificate
- Software Development Fundamentals Certificate
- Data Science Fundamentals Certificate
- Cloud Fundamentals Certificate
- Blockchain Fundamentals Certificate
- IoT Fundamentals Certificate
- Artificial Intelligence Fundamentals Certificate
- COBIT Design and Implementation
- Implementing the NIST Cybersecurity Framework Using COBIT 2019
- COBIT Foundation
- COBIT 5 Certificates

== See also ==
- Information assurance
- Information Security
- Information security management system
- IT risk
- Risk IT Framework
- COBIT
- Committee of Sponsoring Organizations of the Treadway Commission (COSO)
- (ISC)²
- Information Systems Security Association
- List of international professional associations
- IAPP
