= List of ISO standards 22000–23999 =

This is a list of published (Note: This list generally excludes draft versions.) International Organization for Standardization (ISO) standards and other deliverables. (Note: ISO deliverables include "specifications" (ISO/PAS, ISO/TS), "reports" (ISO/TR), etc, which are not referred to by ISO as "standards".) For a complete and up-to-date list of all the ISO standards, see the ISO catalogue.

The standards are protected by copyright and most of them must be purchased. However, about 300 of the standards produced by ISO and IEC's Joint Technical Committee 1 (JTC 1) have been made freely and publicly available.

== ISO 22000 – ISO 22999 ==
- ISO 22000:2018 Food safety management systems – Requirements for any organization in the food chain
- ISO/TS 22002 Prerequisite programmes on food safety
  - ISO/TS 22002-1:2009 Part 1: Food manufacturing
  - ISO/TS 22002-2:2013 Part 2: Catering
  - ISO/TS 22002-3:2011 Part 3: Farming
  - ISO/TS 22002-4:2013 Part 4: Food packaging manufacturing
  - ISO/TS 22002-5:2019 Part 5: Transport and storage
  - ISO/TS 22002-6:2016 Part 6: Feed and animal food production
- ISO/TS 22003:2013 Food safety management systems – Requirements for bodies providing audit and certification of food safety management systems
- ISO 22004:2014 Food safety management systems – Guidance on the application of ISO 22000
- ISO 22005:2007 Traceability in the feed and food chain – General principles and basic requirements for system design and implementation
- ISO 22006:2009 Quality management systems - Guidelines for the application of ISO 9001:2008 to crop production)
- ISO/IEC 22050:2002 Information technology – Data interchange on 12,7 mm, 384-track magnetic tape cartridges – Ultrium-1 format
- ISO/IEC 22051:2002 Information technology – Data interchange on 12,7 mm, 448-track magnetic tape cartridges – SDLT1 format
- ISO 22077 Health informatics – Medical waveform format
  - ISO 22077-1:2015 Part 1: Encoding rules
  - ISO/TS 22077-2:2015 Part 2: Electrocardiography
  - ISO/TS 22077-3:2015 Part 3: Long term electrocardiography
- ISO/IEC 22091:2002 Information technology – Streaming Lossless Data Compression algorithm (SLDC)
- ISO/IEC 22092:2002 Information technology - Data interchange on 130 mm magneto-optical disk cartridges - Capacity: 9,1 Gbytes per cartridge
- ISO 22093 Industrial automation systems and integration – Physical device control – Dimensional Measuring Interface Standard (DMIS)
- ISO 22095:2020 Chain of Custody
- ISO 22096:2007 Condition monitoring and diagnostics of machines – Acoustic emission
- ISO/TR 22100 Safety of machinery – Relationship with ISO 12100
- ISO/TR 22100-3:2016 Part 3: Implementation of ergonomic principles in safety standards
- ISO 22112:2017 Dentistry — Artificial teeth for dental prostheses
- ISO/TS 22117:2010 Microbiology of food and animal feeding stuffs – Specific requirements and guidance for proficiency testing by interlaboratory comparison
- ISO 22118:2011 Microbiology of food and animal feeding stuffs – Polymerase chain reaction (PCR) for the detection and quantification of food-borne pathogens – Performance characteristics
- ISO 22119:2011 Microbiology of food and animal feeding stuffs – Real-time polymerase chain reaction (PCR) for the detection of food-borne pathogens – General requirements and definitions
- ISO 22128:2008 Terminology products and services - Overview and guidance
- ISO/TR 22134:2007 Practical guidelines for socioterminology
- ISO/TS 22163:2017 Railway applications – Quality management system – Business management system requirements for rail organizations: ISO 9001:2015 and particular requirements for application in the rail sector
- ISO 22174:2005 Microbiology of food and animal feeding stuffs – Polymerase chain reaction (PCR) for the detection of food-borne pathogens – General requirements and definitions
- ISO/TS 22220:2011 Health informatics – Identification of subjects of health care
- ISO/TR 22221:2006 Health informatics – Good principles and practices for a clinical data warehouse
- ISO 22222:2005 Personal financial planning—Requirements for personal financial planners
- ISO 22232 Non-destructive testing - Characterization and verification of ultrasonic test equipment
  - Part 1: Instruments
  - Part 2: Probes
  - Part 3: Combined equipment
- ISO 22241 Diesel engines – NOx reduction agent AUS 32
  - ISO 22241-1 Quality requirements
  - ISO 22241-2 Test methods
  - ISO 22241-3 Handling, transportation and storing
- ISO/IEC TR 22250 Information technology – Document description and processing languages – Regular Language Description for XML (RELAX)
  - ISO/IEC TR 22250-1:2002 RELAX Core
- ISO 22266 Mechanical vibration – Torsional vibration of rotating machinery
  - ISO 22266-1:2009 Part 1: Land-based steam and gas turbine generator sets in excess of 50 MW
- ISO 22274:2013 Systems to manage terminology, knowledge and content - Concept-related aspects for developing and internationalizing classification systems
- ISO/IEC 22275:2018 Information technology – Programming languages, their environments, and system software interfaces – ECMAScript® Specification Suite
- ISO/IEC TS 22277:2017 Technical Specification – C++ Extensions for Coroutines
- ISO 22300:2025 Security and resilience – Vocabulary
- ISO 22301:2019 Security and resilience – Business continuity management systems – Requirements
- ISO/TR 22302:2014 Natural gas - Calculation of methane number
- ISO 22303:2008 Tobacco - Determination of tobacco specific nitrosamines - Method using buffer extraction
- ISO/TS 22304:2008 Tobacco - Determination of tobacco specific nitrosamines - Method using alkaline dichloromethane extraction
- ISO/TR 22305:2006 Cigarettes - Measurement of nicotine-free dry particulate matter, nicotine, water and carbon monoxide in cigarette smoke - Analysis of data from collaborative studies reporting relationships between repeatability, reproducibility and tolerances
- ISO 22306:2007 Fibre-reinforced cement pipe, joints and fittings for gravity systems
- ISO 22307:2008 Financial services – Privacy impact assessment
- ISO 22308:2005 Cork stoppers - Sensory analysis
- ISO 22309:2011 Microbeam analysis - Quantitative analysis using energy-dispersive spectrometry (EDS) for elements with an atomic number of 11 (Na) or above
- ISO 22310:2006 Information and documentation - Guidelines for standards drafters for stating records management requirements in standards
- ISO 22311:2012 Societal security – Video-surveillance – Export interoperability
- ISO/TR 22312:2011 Societal security – Technological capabilities (WITHDRAWN)
- ISO 22313:2020 Security and resilience – Business continuity management systems – Guidance on the use of ISO 22301
- ISO 22314:2006 Plastics - Glass-fibre-reinforced products - Determination of fibre length
- ISO 22315:2015 Societal security – Mass evacuation – Guidelines for planning
- ISO 22316:2017 Security and resilience - Organizational resilience—Principles and attributes
- ISO/TS 22317:2015 Societal security – Business continuity management systems – Guidelines for business impact analysis
- ISO/TS 22318:2015 Societal security – Business continuity management systems – Guidelines for supply chain continuity
- ISO 22319:2017 Security and resilience – Community resilience – Guidelines for planning the involvement of spontaneous volunteers
- ISO 22320:2018 Security and resilience – Emergency management – Guidelines for incident management
- ISO 22322:2015 Societal security – Emergency management – Guidelines for public warning
- ISO 22324:2015 Societal security – Emergency management – Guidelines for colour coded alert
- ISO 22325:2016 Security and resilience – Emergency management – Guidelines for capability assessment
- ISO 22326:2018 Security and resilience – Emergency management – Guidelines for monitoring facilities with identified hazards
- ISO 22327:2018 Security and resilience – Emergency management – Guidelines for implementation of a community-based landslide early warning system
- ISO/TS 22330:2018 Security and resilience – Business continuity management systems – Guidelines for people aspects on business continuity
- ISO/TS 22331:2018 Security and resilience – Business continuity management systems – Guidelines for business continuity strategy
- ISO/TR 22335:2007 Surface chemical analysis - Depth profiling - Measurement of sputtering rate: mesh-replica method using a mechanical stylus profilometer
- ISO 22340:2024 Security and resilience – Protective security – Guidelines for an enterprise protective security architecture and framework
- ISO 22341:2021 Security and resilience – Protective security – Guidelines for crime prevention through environmental design
- ISO 22342:2023 Security and resilience – Protective security – Guidelines for the development of a security plan for an organization
- ISO 22343-1:2023 Security and resilience – Vehicle security barriers — Part 1: Performance requirement, vehicle impact test method and performance rating
- ISO 22343-2:2023 Security and resilience – Vehicle security barriers — Part 2: Application
- ISO/TR 22351:2015 Societal security – Emergency management – Message structure for exchange of information
- ISO/TS 22367:2008 Medical laboratories - Reduction of error through risk management and continual improvement
- ISO 22368-1:2004 Crop protection equipment - Test methods for the evaluation of cleaning systems - Part 1: Internal cleaning of complete sprayers
- ISO 22369-1:2006 Crop protection equipment - Drift classification of spraying equipment - Part 1: Classes
- ISO 22373:2025 Security and resilience – Authenticity, integrity and trust for products and documents – Framework for establishing trustworthy supply and value chains
- ISO 22374:2005 Dentistry - Dental handpieces - Electrical-powered scalers and scaler tips
- ISO/TS 22375:2018 Security and resilience - Guidelines for complexity assessment process
- ISO 22376:2023 Security and resilience – Authenticity, integrity and trust for products and documents – Specification and usage of visible digital seal (VDS) data format for authentication, verification and acquisition of data carried by a document or object
- ISO 22378:2022 Security and resilience – Authenticity, integrity and trust for products and documents – Guidelines for interoperable object identification and related authentication systems to deter counterfeiting and illicit trade
- ISO 22380:2018 Security and resilience – Authenticity, integrity and trust for products and documents – General principles for product fraud risk
- ISO 22381:2018 Security and resilience – Authenticity, integrity and trust for products and documents – Guidelines for interoperability of product identification and authentication systems
- ISO 22382:2018 Security and resilience – Authenticity, integrity and trust for products and documents – Guidelines for the content, security and issuance of excise tax stamps
- ISO 22383:2020 Security and resilience – Authenticity, integrity and trust for products and documents – Guidelines and performance criteria for authentication solutions for material goods
- ISO 22384:2020 Security and resilience – Authenticity, integrity and trust for products and documents - Guidelines to establish and monitor a protection plan and its implementation
- ISO 22385:2023 Security and resilience – Authenticity, integrity and trust for products and documents - Guidelines to establish a framework for trust and interoperability
- ISO/TS 22386:2024 Security and resilience – Authenticity, integrity and trust for products and documents - Guidelines for brand protection and enforcement procedures
- ISO 22387:2022 Security and resilience – Authenticity, integrity and trust for products and documents - Validation procedures for the application of artefact metrics
- ISO 22388:2023 Security and resilience – Authenticity, integrity and trust for products and documents - Guidelines for securing physical documents
- ISO 22389-1:2010 Timber structures - Bending strength of I-beams - Part 1: Testing, evaluation and characterization
- ISO 22390:2010 Timber structures - Laminated veneer lumber - Structural properties
- ISO 22391-1:2009 Plastics piping systems for hot and cold water installations - Polyethylene of raised temperature resistance (PE-RT) - Part 1: General
- ISO 22392:2020 Security and resilience – Community resilience – Guidelines for conducting peer reviews
- ISO 22394:2010 Hardmetals - Knoop hardness test
- ISO 22395:2018 Security and resilience – Community resilience – Guidelines for supporting vulnerable persons in an emergency
- ISO 22396:2020 Security and resilience – Community resilience – Guidelines for information exchange between organisations
- ISO 22397:2014 Societal security – Guidelines for establishing partnering arrangements
- ISO 22398:2014 Societal security – Guidelines for exercises
- ISO/PAS 22399:2007 Societal security – Guideline for incident preparedness and operational continuity management (WITHDRAWN)
- ISO/TR 22411:2008 Ergonomics data and guidelines for the application of ISO/IEC Guide 71 to products and services to address the needs of older persons and persons with disabilities
- ISO 22412:2017 Particle size analysis - Dynamic light scattering (DLS)
- ISO 22413:2010 Transfer sets for pharmaceutical preparations – Requirements and test methods
- ISO 22432:2011 Geometrical product specifications (GPS) - Features utilized in specification and verification
- ISO/TS 22475 Geotechnical investigation and testing – Sampling methods and groundwater measurements
  - ISO/TS 22475-3:2007 Part 3: Conformity assessment of enterprises and personnel by third party
- ISO 22493:2014 Microbeam analysis - Scanning electron microscopy - Vocabulary
- ISO 22514 Statistical methods in process management - Capability and performance
  - ISO 22514-1:2014 Part 1: General principles and concepts
  - ISO 22514-2:2017 Part 2: Process capability and performance of time-dependent process models
  - ISO 22514-3:2008 Part 3: Machine performance studies for measured data on discrete parts
  - ISO 22514-4:2016 Part 4: Process capability estimates and performance measures
  - ISO 22514-6:2013 Part 6: Process capability statistics for characteristics following a multivariate normal distribution
  - ISO 22514-7:2012 Part 7: Capability of measurement processes
  - ISO 22514-8:2014 Part 8: Machine performance of a multi-state production process
- ISO 22523:2006 External limb prostheses and external orthoses – Requirements and test methods
- ISO/IEC 22533:2005 Information technology - Data interchange on 90 mm optical disk cartridges - Capacity: 2,3 Gbytes per cartridge
- ISO/IEC 22534:2005 Information technology – Telecommunications and information exchange between systems – Application session services
- ISO/IEC 22535:2009 Information technology – Telecommunications and information exchange between systems – Corporate telecommunication networks – Tunnelling of QSIG over SIP
- ISO/IEC 22536:2013 Information technology - Telecommunications and information exchange between systems - Near Field Communication Interface and Protocol (NFCIP-1) - RF interface test methods
- ISO/IEC 22537:2006 Information technology - ECMAScript for XML (E4X) specification
- ISO/TR 22588:2005 Optics and photonics – Lasers and laser-related equipment – Measurement and evaluation of absorption-induced effects in laser optical components
- ISO 22600 Health informatics – Privilege management and access control
  - ISO 22600-1:2014 Part 1: Overview and policy management
  - ISO 22600-2:2014 Part 2: Formal models
  - ISO 22600-3:2014 Part 3: Implementations
- ISO 22665:2012 Ophthalmic optics and instruments – Instruments to measure axial distances in the eye
- ISO 22675:2016 Prosthetics – Testing of ankle-foot devices and foot units – Requirements and test methods
- ISO/TR 22676:2006 Prosthetics – Testing of ankle-foot devices and foot units – Guidance on the application of the test loading conditions of ISO 22675 and on the design of appropriate test equipment
- ISO 22716:2007 Cosmetics – Good Manufacturing Practices (GMP) – Guidelines on Good Manufacturing Practices
- ISO 22717:2015 Cosmetics – Microbiology – Detection of Pseudomonas aeruginosa
- ISO 22718:2015 Cosmetics – Microbiology – Detection of Staphylococcus aureus
- ISO 22727:2007 Graphical symbols - Creation and design of public information symbols - Requirements
- ISO 22742:2010 Packaging - Linear bar code and two-dimensional symbols for product packaging
- ISO 22745 Industrial automation systems and integration - Open technical dictionaries and their application to master data
  - ISO 22745-2:2010 Part 2: Vocabulary
- ISO/IEC TR 22767:2005 Information technology – Telecommunications and information exchange between systems – Using CSTA for SIP phone user agents (uaCSTA)
- ISO/TS 22789:2010 Health informatics – Conceptual framework for patient findings and problems in terminologies
- ISO/TS 22809:2007 Non-destructive testing – Discontinuities in specimens for use in qualification examinations
- ISO 22829:2017 Resistance welding equipment – Transformers – Integrated transformer-rectifier units for welding guns operating at 1 000 Hz
- ISO 22837:2009 Vehicle probe data for wide area communications
- ISO 22839:2013 Intelligent transport systems – Forward vehicle collision mitigation systems – Operation, performance, and verification requirements
- ISO 22840:2010 Intelligent transport systems – Devices to aid reverse manoeuvres – Extended-range backing aid systems (ERBA)
- ISO/PAS 22853:2005 Ships and marine technology – Computer applications – Specification of Maritime Safety Markup Language (MSML)
- ISO 22857:2013 Health informatics – Guidelines on data protection to facilitate trans-border flows of personal health data
- ISO 22868:2011 Forestry and gardening machinery – Noise test code for portable hand-held machines with internal combustion engine – Engineering method (Grade 2 accuracy)
- ISO 22870:2016 Point-of-care testing (POCT) – Requirements for quality and competence
- ISO 22877:2004 Castors and wheels – Vocabulary, symbols and multilingual terminology
- ISO 22935 Milk and milk products – Sensory analysis
  - ISO 22935-1:2009 Part 1: General guidance for the recruitment, selection, training and monitoring of assessors
- ISO 22951:2009 Data dictionary and message sets for preemption and prioritization signal systems for emergency and public transport vehicles (PRESTO)
- ISO 22964:2017 Microbiology of the food chain - Horizontal method for the detection of Cronobacter spp.
- ISO/TR 22971:2005 Accuracy (trueness and precision) of measurement methods and results - Practical guidance for the use of ISO 5725-2:1994 in designing, implementing and statistically analysing interlaboratory repeatability and reproducibility results
- ISO/TR 22979:2017 Ophthalmic implants – Intraocular lenses – Guidance on assessment of the need for clinical investigation of intraocular lens design modifications

== ISO 23000 – ISO 23999 ==
- ISO/IEC 23000 Information technology - Multimedia application format (MPEG-A)
- ISO/IEC 23001 Information technology – MPEG systems technologies
  - ISO/IEC 23001-1:2006 Part 1: Binary MPEG format for XML
  - ISO/IEC 23001-2:2008 Part 2: Fragment request units
  - ISO/IEC 23001-3:2008 Part 3: XML IPMP messages
  - ISO/IEC 23001-4:2017 Part 4: Codec configuration representation
  - ISO/IEC 23001-5:2008 Part 5: Bitstream Syntax Description Language (BSDL)
  - ISO/IEC 23001-7:2016 Part 7: Common encryption in ISO base media file format
  - ISO/IEC 23001-8:2016 Part 8: Coding-independent code points
  - ISO/IEC 23001-9:2016 Part 9: Common encryption of MPEG-2 transport streams
  - ISO/IEC 23001-10:2015 Part 10: Carriage of timed metadata metrics of media in ISO base media file format
  - ISO/IEC 23001-12:2015 Part 12: Sample Variants in the ISO base media file format
- ISO/IEC 23002 Information technology – MPEG video technologies
- ISO/IEC 23003 Information technology – MPEG audio technologies
  - ISO/IEC 23003-1:2007 Part 1: MPEG Surround
  - ISO/IEC 23003-2:2010 Part 2: Spatial Audio Object Coding (SAOC)
  - ISO/IEC 23003-3:2012 Part 3: Unified speech and audio coding
  - ISO/IEC 23003-4:2015 Part 4: Dynamic Range Control
- ISO/IEC 23004 Information technology - Multimedia Middleware
  - ISO/IEC 23004-1:2007 Part 1: Architecture
  - ISO/IEC 23004-2:2007 Part 2: Multimedia application programming interface (API)
  - ISO/IEC 23004-3:2007 Part 3: Component model
  - ISO/IEC 23004-4:2007 Part 4: Resource and quality management
  - ISO/IEC 23004-5:2008 Part 5: Component download
  - ISO/IEC 23004-6:2008 Part 6: Fault management
  - ISO/IEC 23004-7:2008 Part 7: System integrity management
  - ISO/IEC 23004-8:2009 Part 8: Reference software
- ISO/IEC 23005 Information technology - Media context and control
  - ISO/IEC 23005-1:2016 Part 1: Architecture
  - ISO/IEC 23005-2:2016 Part 2: Control information
  - ISO/IEC 23005-3:2016 Part 3: Sensory information
  - ISO/IEC 23005-4:2016 Part 4: Virtual world object characteristics
  - ISO/IEC 23005-5:2016 Part 5: Data formats for interaction devices
  - ISO/IEC 23005-6:2016 Part 6: Common types and tools
  - ISO/IEC 23005-7:2017 Part 7: Conformance and reference software
- ISO/IEC 23006 Information technology - Multimedia service platform technologies
  - ISO/IEC 23006-1:2013 Part 1: Architecture
  - ISO/IEC 23006-2:2016 Part 2: MPEG extensible middleware (MXM) API
  - ISO/IEC 23006-3:2016 Part 3: Conformance and reference software
  - ISO/IEC 23006-4:2013 Part 4: Elementary services
  - ISO/IEC 23006-5:2013 Part 5: Service aggregation
- ISO/IEC 23007 Information technology - Rich media user interfaces
  - ISO/IEC 23007-1:2010 Part 1: Widgets
  - ISO/IEC 23007-2:2012 Part 2: Advanced user interaction (AUI) interfaces
  - ISO/IEC 23007-3:2011 Part 3: Conformance and reference software
- ISO/IEC 23008 Information technology - High efficiency coding and media delivery in heterogeneous environments
- ISO/IEC 23009 Information technology - Dynamic adaptive streaming over HTTP (DASH)
  - ISO/IEC 23009-1:2014 Part 1: Media presentation description and segment formats
  - ISO/IEC 23009-2:2014 Part 2: Conformance and reference software
  - ISO/IEC TR 23009-3:2015 Part 3: Implementation guidelines
  - ISO/IEC 23009-4:2013 Part 4: Segment encryption and authentication
  - ISO/IEC 23009-5:2017 Part 5: Server and network assisted DASH (SAND)
- ISO/IEC/IEEE 23026:2015 Systems and software engineering - Engineering and management of websites for systems, software, and services information
- ISO 23081 Information and documentation - Managing metadata for records (Note: The exact wording of this title varies between parts. This is the wording of the most recently published part.)
  - ISO 23081-1:2006 Part 1: Principles
  - ISO 23081-2:2009 Part 2: Conceptual and implementation issues
  - ISO/TR 23081-3:2011 Part 3: Self-assessment method
- ISO/IEC 23092:2021 Bioinformatics - Genomic information representation
- ISO/TS 23165:2006 Geometrical product specifications (GPS) - Guidelines for the evaluation of coordinate measuring machine (CMM) test uncertainty
- ISO 23185:2009 Assessment and benchmarking of terminological resources - General concepts, principles and requirements
- ISO/TR 23211:2009 Hydrometry – Measuring the water level in a well using automated pressure transducer methods
- ISO/IEC 23264 Information security — Redaction of authentic data
  - ISO/IEC 23264-1:2021 Part 1: General
- ISO/IEC 23270:2018 Information technology – Programming languages – C#
- ISO/IEC 23271:2012 Information technology – Common Language Infrastructure (CLI)
- ISO/IEC TR 23272:2011 Information technology - Common Language Infrastructure (CLI) - Information Derived from Partition IV XML File
- ISO/IEC 23289:2002 Information technology – Telecommunications and information exchange between systems – Corporate telecommunication networks – Signalling interworking between QSIG and H.323 – Basic services
- ISO/IEC 23290:2004 Information technology – Telecommunications and information exchange between systems – Private Integrated Services Network (PISN) – Mapping functions for the tunnelling of QSIG through H.323 networks
- ISO 23317:2014 Implants for surgery – In vitro evaluation for apatite-forming ability of implant materials
- ISO 23328 Breathing system filters for anaesthetic and respiratory use
  - ISO 23328-1:2003 Part 1: Salt test method to assess filtration performance
  - ISO 23328-2:2002 Part 2: Non-filtration aspects
- ISO/IEC 23360 Linux Standard Base (LSB) core specification 3.1
- ISO 23500:2014 Guidance for the preparation and quality management of fluids for haemodialysis and related therapies
- ISO 23539:2005 Photometry - The CIE system of physical photometry
- ISO 23599:2012 Assistive products for blind and vision-impaired persons - Tactile walking surface indicators
- ISO 23600:2007 Assistive products for persons with vision impairments and persons with vision and hearing impairments - Acoustic and tactile signals for pedestrian traffic lights
- ISO 23601:2009 Safety identification - Escape and evacuation plan signs
- ISO 23603:2005 Standard method of assessing the spectral quality of daylight simulators for visual appraisal and measurement of colour
- ISO/TR 23605:2009 Technical product specification (TPS) – Application guidance – International model for national implementation
- ISO/IEC 23651:2003 Information technology – 8 mm wide magnetic tape cartridge for information interchange – Helical scan recording – AIT-3 format
- ISO 23718:2007 Metallic materials – Mechanical testing – Vocabulary
- ISO 23733 Textiles – Chenille yarns – Test method for the determination of linear density
- ISO 23747:2015 Anaesthetic and respiratory equipment – Peak expiratory flow meters for the assessment of pulmonary function in spontaneously breathing humans
- ISO/TS 23768 Rolling bearings - Parts library
  - ISO/TS 23768-1:2011 Part 1: Reference dictionary for rolling bearings
- ISO 23771:2015 Textile machinery – Guide to the design of textile machinery for reduction of the noise emissions
- ISO/TS 23810:2012 Cardiovascular implants and artificial organs – Checklist for preoperative extracorporeal circulation equipment setup
- ISO 23813:2007 Cranes – Training of appointed persons
- ISO 23814:2009 Cranes – Competency requirements for crane inspectors
- ISO 23833:2013 Microbeam analysis – Electron probe microanalysis (EPMA) – Vocabulary
- ISO 23853:2004 Cranes – Training of slingers and signallers
- ISO 23907:2012 Sharps injury protection – Requirements and test methods – Sharps containers
- ISO 23908:2011 Sharps injury protection – Requirements and test methods – Sharps protection features for single-use hypodermic needles, introducers for catheters and needles used for blood sampling
- ISO/IEC 23912:2005 Information technology - 80 mm (1,46 Gbytes per side) and 120 mm (4,70 Gbytes per side) DVD Recordable Disk (DVD-R)
- ISO/IEC 23915:2005 Information technology – Telecommunications and information exchange between systems – Corporate Telecommunication Networks – Signalling Interworking between QSIG and SIP – Call Diversion
- ISO/IEC 23916:2005 Information technology – Telecommunications and information exchange between systems – Corporate Telecommunication Networks – Signalling Interworking between QSIG and SIP – Call Transfer
- ISO/IEC 23917:2005 Information technology – Telecommunications and information exchange between systems – NFCIP-1 – Protocol Test Methods
- ISO 23950:1998 Information and documentation – Information retrieval (Z39.50) – Application service definition and protocol specification
- ISO 23953 Refrigerated display cabinets
  - ISO 23953-1:2015 Part 1: Vocabulary
- ISO/IEC 23988:2007 Information technology - A code of practice for the use of information technology (IT) in the delivery of assessments
