= ISO/TC 223 =

ISO/TC 223 Societal security was a technical committee of the International Organization for Standardization formed in 2001 to develop standards in the area of societal security: i.e. protection of society from and response to incidents, emergencies, and disasters caused by intentional and unintentional human acts, natural hazards, and technical failures.

== History ==
The sinking of the Russian submarine Kursk to the bottom of the Barents Sea in 2000 can be cited as a major impetus for the formation of ISO/TC 223. The international salvage operation that followed the accident provided painful evidence that the international community lacked the tools necessary to cooperate effectively in emergency situations, resulting in an initiative from the Russian standards organization, GOST, to establish ISO/TC 223. Originally titled Civil defence, the committee was created to standardize international emergency procedures.

The initiative lay dormant for some time. However, terrorist actions, including the 9/11 attacks on New York and Washington, as well as a surge in natural disasters in recent years, led ISO to conduct a large-scale assessment of the role of standardization in the security field. One important decision was to put ISO/TC 223 into action.

In 2005 the chairmanship of the committee was taken over by SIS, the Swedish Standards Institute. To better reflect its ambition to take a broader approach toward disruptive incidents that threaten the civil society, the committee was renamed Societal security.

ISO/TC 223 was actively developing a series of international standards for more than eight years. In 2014, the Technical Management Board of ISO decided to merge ISO/TC 223 with other committees in the area of security for better coordination. The new committee began on 1 January 2015 and is called ISO/TC 292 Security and resilience.

== Scope ==
ISO/TC 223 worked under the following scope:

ISO/TC 223 develops International standards that aim to increase societal security, i.e. protection of society from and response to incidents, emergencies, and disasters caused by intentional and unintentional human acts, natural hazards, and technical failures. An all-hazards perspective is used covering adaptive, proactive and reactive strategies in all phases before, during and after a disruptive incident. The area of societal security is multi-disciplinary and involves actors from both the public and private sectors, including not-for-profit organizations.

== Leadership and organisation ==
Chair

- 2006-2012 Mr Krister Kumlin
- 2013-2014 Mrs Åsa Kyrk Gere

Secretary

- 2006 Mr Per Forsgren
- 2006-2013 Dr Stefan Tangen
- 2013 Mrs Sanna Edlund
- 2014 Mr Bengt Rydstedt

ISO/TC 223 established the following working groups: WG 1, WG 2, WG 3, WG 4, WG 5 and WG 6.

ISO/TC 223 became one of the larger committees in ISO with around 70 member countries.

== Introduction to societal security ==
Societal security is a concept in security studies developed by the Copenhagen School, particularly with the work of Barry Buzan and Ole Wæver in the early 1990s. Societal security refers to the ability of a society to maintain its essential character (especially its collective identity, language, culture and traditions) under changing conditions in the face of possible or actual threats.

Unlike traditional state-centric security paradigms, societal security treats society itself as the central entity to be secured; highlighting threats such as migration, cukturak

In recent years there have been many highly consequential natural disasters, terrorist attacks and severe crises, which have propelled the issue of crisis management to the top of the national agenda in many countries. As functions in society are shared there is a need to engage individuals, organizations, the private sector and the government in an inclusive discussion on how to better prepare, respond to and recover from crises.

Now and in the future, survival of nations and citizens concerns the security of critical functions of society, rather than only the classical focus on the security of the territory. This shift entails the ability of the government and civil society to function, critical infrastructures to be maintained, the democratic ability to govern, and to manifest certain basic values. Such abilities are put under pressure during severe crises. In societal security several elements that traditionally have been kept apart are becoming fused: procedures for peace and war merge, internal and external security are interlocked, and the ambitions of enhancing state security and providing citizen safety become blurred.

These are new and more complex challenges. These challenges have implications for what (concepts and) tools we need to enhance security, citizens safety and crisis management capacity in an increasingly interdependent and borderless world. Such trans-boundary challenges are not covered by the traditional concept of national civil defence.

Thus, the proposed umbrella-concept of societal security is aimed at countering the threats and vulnerabilities in society that require comprehensive crisis management and business continuity systems which are multi-sector, multi-national and multi-continental.

Increased societal security requires a capacity for holistic crisis management emphasizing interoperability and including all key phases of crises. This capacity should have an overall flexibility in order to be able to manage crises that include un-predicted and unexpected elements and events. The purpose is to build a greater overall resilience in the face of a broad range of societal vulnerabilities and disruptive challenges.

== The ISO 22300 series ==
The following international standards and other publications have been developed by ISO/TC 223:

Stand alone documents

- ISO 22300:2012 Societal security – Terminology
- ISO 22311:2012 Societal security – Video-surveillance – Export interoperability
- ISO/TR 22312:2011 Societal security – Technological capabilities
- ISO 22315:2014 Societal security – Mass evacuation – Guidelines for planning
- ISO 22397:2014 Societal security – Guidelines for establishing partnering arrangements
- ISO 22398:2013 Societal security – Guidelines for exercises

Business continuity management systems

- ISO 22301:2012 Societal security – Business continuity management systems – Requirements
- ISO 22313:2012 Societal security – Business continuity management systems – Guidance
- ISO/TS 22317:2015 Societal security – Business continuity management systems – Guidelines for business impact analysis (BIA)
- ISO/PAS 22399:2007 Societal security – Guideline for incident preparedness and operational continuity management
- ISO/TS 17021-6:2014 Conformity assessment - Requirements for bodies providing audit and certification of management systems - Part 6: Competence requirements for auditing and certification of business continuity management systems (Joint project with ISO/CASCO)

Emergency management

- ISO 22320:2011 Societal security – Emergency management – Requirements for incident response
- ISO 22322:2015 Societal security – Emergency management – Guidelines for public warning
- ISO 22324:2015 Societal security – Emergency management – Guidelines for colour-coded alert
- ISO/TR 22351:2015 Societal security – Emergency management – Message structure for interoperability

== See also ==
- Business continuity planning
- Crisis management
- Gold–silver–bronze command structure
- Interoperability
