= Japanese Industrial Standards =

Technical standard in Japan

JIS symbol (adopted October 1, 2005). No Unicode symbol exists, nor does a proposal for inclusion.

The old JIS symbol (used until September 30, 2008). This symbol has been included in Unicode since version 1.0.1 as U+3004 〄 JAPANESE INDUSTRIAL STANDARD SYMBOL.

Japanese Industrial Standards (JIS) (日本産業規格, Nihon Sangyō Kikaku; formerly 日本工業規格 Nihon Kōgyō Kikaku until June 30, 2019) are the standards used for industrial activities in Japan, coordinated by the Japanese Industrial Standards Committee (JISC) and published by the Japanese Standards Association (JSA). The JISC is composed of many nationwide committees and plays a vital role in standardizing activities across Japan.

== History ==
In the Meiji era, private enterprises were responsible for making standards, although the Japanese government too had standards and specification documents for procurement purposes for certain articles, such as munitions.

These were summarized to form an official standard, the Japanese Engineering Standard, in 1921. During World War II, simplified standards were established to increase matériel output.

The present Japanese Standards Association was established in 1946, a year after Japan's defeat in World War II. The Japanese Industrial Standards Committee regulations were promulgated in 1946, and new standards were formed.

The Industrial Standardization Law was enacted in 1949, which forms the legal foundation for the present Japanese Industrial Standards.

=== New JIS mark ===
The Industrial Standardization Law was revised in 2004 and the JIS product certification mark was changed; since October 1, 2005, the new JIS mark has been used upon re-certification. Use of the old mark was allowed during a three-year transition period ending on September 30, 2008, and every manufacturer was able to use the new JIS mark. Therefore all JIS-certified Japanese products manufactured since October 1, 2008, have had the new JIS mark.

Construction of the symbol

== Standards classification and numbering ==
Standards are named in the format "JIS X 0208:1997", where X denotes area division, followed by four digits designating the area (five digits for ISO-corresponding standards), and four final digits designating the revision year.

Divisions of JIS and significant standards are:

=== A ===
- Civil engineering and architecture
  - JIS A 0001 – Basic module to ISO 1006
  - JIS A 0002 – Glossary of terms used in building module to ISO 1791
  - JIS A 0003 – Tolerances for building to ISO 3443-5
  - JIS A 0004 – Principle of modular coordination in buildings to ISO 2848

=== B ===
- Mechanical engineering
  - JIS B 1012 - JIS screw drive, which is not the same as Phillips
  - JIS B 7021:2013 – Water resistant watches for general use—Classification and water resistance
  - JIS B 7512:2016 – Steel tape measures
  - JIS B 7516:2005 – Metal rules

=== C ===
- Electronics and electrical engineering
  - JIS C 0920:2003 – Degrees of protection provided by enclosures (IP Code)
  - JIS C 3202:2014 – Enamelled winding wires
  - JIS C 5062:2008 – Marking codes for resistors and capacitors
  - JIS C 5063:1997 – Preferred number series for resistors and capacitors
  - JIS C 7001 – Type designation system for electronic tubes
  - JIS C 7012 – Type designation system for discrete semiconductor devices
  - JIS C 8800:2008 – Glossary of terms for fuel cell power systems

=== D ===
- Automotive engineering
  - JIS D 0004-1 – Earth-moving machinery−Scrapers− Part 1 : Terminology and commercial specifications to ISO 7133
  - JIS D 0004-2 – Earth-moving machinery−Scrapers− Part 2 : Standard form of specifications and testing methods
  - JIS D 0004-3 – Earth-moving machinery−Scrapers− Part 3 : Bowl volumetric raing to ISO 6485

=== E ===
- Railway engineering
  - JIS E 1101 – Flat bottom railway rails and special rails for switches and crossings of non-treated steel to ISO 5003
  - JIS E 1102 – Fish plates for rails to ISO 6305-1
  - JIS E 1107 – Steel bolts and nuts for fish-plates and fastenings to ISO 6305-4
  - JIS E 2001 – Electric traction contact lines−Vocabulary to IEC 60050 (811),IEC 60913
  - JIS E 4001 – Railway rolling stock-Vocabulary to IEC 60050-811
  - JIS E 4041 – Rolling stock-Testing of rolling stock on completion of construction and before entry into service to IEC 61133
  - JIS E 4042 – General rules for the test methods of electric locomotives on completion of construction to IEC 61133
  - JIS E 4043 – General rules for the test methods of diesel railcar on completion of construction to IEC 61133
  - JIS E 4044 – General rules for the test methods of diesel locomotives on completion of construction to IEC 61133

=== F ===
- Ship building
  - JIS F 0013 - Ships and marine technology-Vocabulary-Deck machinery and outfittings to ISO 3828 & ISO 8147

=== G ===
- Ferrous materials and metallurgy
  - JIS G 3101 – Rolled steels for general structure
  - JIS G 3103 – Carbon steel and molybdenum alloy steel plates for boilers and pressure vessels
  - JIS G 3106 – Rolled steels for welded structure
  - JIS G 3108 – Rolled carbon steel for cold-finished steel bars
  - JIS G 3114 - Hot-rolled atmospheric corrosion resisting steels for welded structure
  - JIS G 3115 – Steel plates for pressure vessels for intermediate temperature service
  - JIS G 3118 – Carbon steel plates for pressure vessels for intermediate and moderate temperature services
  - JIS G 3126 – Carbon steel plates for pressure vessels for low temperature service
  - JIS G 3141 – Commercial Cold Rolled SPCC Steels
  - JIS G 4304 – Hot-rolled stainless steel plate, sheet and strip
  - JIS G 4305 – Cold-rolled stainless steel plate, sheet and strip

=== H ===
- Nonferrous materials and metallurgy
  - JIS H 2105 – Pig lead
  - JIS H 2107 – Zinc ingots
  - JIS H 2113 – Cadmium metal
  - JIS H 2116 – Tungsten powder and tungsten carbide powder
  - JIS H 2118 – Aluminum alloy ingots for die castings
  - JIS H 2121 – Electrolytic cathode copper
  - JIS H 2141 – Silver bullion
  - JIS H 2201 – Zinc alloy ingots for die casting
  - JIS H 2202 – Copper alloy ingots for castings
  - JIS H 2211 – Aluminium alloy ingots for castings
  - JIS H 2501 – Phosphor copper metal
  - JIS H 3100 – Copper and copper alloy sheets, plates and strips
  - JIS H 3110 – Phosphor bronze and nickel silver sheets, plates and strips
  - JIS H 3130 – Copper beryllium alloy, copper titanium alloy, phosphor bronze, copper-nickel-tin alloy and nickel silver sheets, plates and strips for springs
  - JIS H 3140 – Copper bus bars
  - JIS H 3250 – Copper and copper alloy rods and bars
  - JIS H 3260 – Copper and copper alloy wires
  - JIS H 3270 – Copper beryllium alloy, phosphor bronze and nickel silver rods, bars and wires
  - JIS H 3300 – Copper and copper alloy seamless pipes and tubes
  - JIS H 3320 – Copper and copper alloy welded pipes and tubes
  - JIS H 3330 – Plastic covered copper tubes
  - JIS H 3401 – Pipe fittings of copper and copper alloys
  - JIS H 4000 – Aluminum and aluminum alloy sheets and plates, strips and coiled sheets
  - JIS H 4001 – Painted aluminum and aluminum alloy sheets and strips
  - JIS H 4040 – Aluminum and aluminum alloy rods, bars and wires
  - JIS H 4080 – Aluminum and aluminum alloys extruded tubes and cold-drawn tubes
  - JIS H 4090 – Aluminum and aluminum alloy welded pipes and tubes
  - JIS H 4100 – Aluminum and aluminum alloy extruded shape
  - JIS H 4160 – Aluminum and aluminum alloy foils
  - JIS H 4170 – High purity aluminum foils
  - JIS H 4301 – Lead and lead alloy sheets and plates
  - JIS H 4303 – DM lead sheets and plates
  - JIS H 4311 – Lead and lead alloy tubes for common industries
  - JIS H 4461 – Tungsten wires for lighting and electronic equipment
  - JIS H 4463 – Thoriated tungsten wires and rods for lighting and electronic equipment
  - JIS H 4631 – Titanium and titanium alloy tubes for heat exchangers
  - JIS H 4635 – Titanium and titanium alloy welded pipes
  - JIS H 5401 – White metal
  - JIS H 8300 – Thermal spraying―zinc, aluminum and their alloys
  - JIS H 8601 – Anodic oxide coatings on aluminum and aluminum alloys
  - JIS H 8602 – Combined coatings of anodic oxide and organic coatings on aluminum and aluminum alloys
  - JIS H 8615 – Electroplated coatings of chromium for engineering purposes
  - JIS H 8641 – Zinc hot dip galvanizing
  - JIS H 8642 – Hot dip aluminized coatings on ferrous products

=== K ===
- Chemical engineering
  - JIS K 0061 - Test methods for density and relative density of chemical products to ISO 758

=== L ===
- Textile engineering

=== M ===
- Mining

=== P ===
- Pulp and paper
  - JIS P 0138 - Writing paper and certain classes of printed matter −Trimmed sizes−A and B series to ISO 216
  - JIS P 0138-61 (JIS P 0138:1998) - Process finished paper size (ISO 216 with a slightly larger B series)

=== Q ===
- Management systems
  - JIS Q 0073 - Risk management-Vocabulary
  - JIS Q 9000 - Quality management systems-Fundamentals and vocabulary to ISO 9000
  - JIS Q 9001 - Quality management systems - requirements
  - JIS Q 9002 - Quality management systems - Guidelines for the application of JIS Q 9001
  - JIS Q 9004 - Quality management - Quality of an organization - Guidance to achieve sustained success
  - JIS Q 9005 - Quality management systems - Guidelines for sustained success
  - JIS Q 10002 - Quality management-Customer satisfaction- Guidelines for complaints handling in organizations to ISO 10002
  - JIS Q 14001 - Environment management systems - requirements with guidance for use
  - JIS Q 15001 - Personal information protection management systems - requirements
  - JIS Q 20000-1 - IT service management - specification
  - JIS Q 21500 - Guidance on project management to ISO 21500
  - JIS Q 22300 - Societal security-Terminology to ISO 22300
  - JIS Q 22301 - Security and resilience-Business continuity management systems-Requirements to ISO 22301
  - JIS Q 22313 - Societal security-Business continuity management systems-Guidance to ISO 22313
  - JIS Q 27001 - Information security management systems - requirements
  - JIS Q 31000 - Risk management-Guidelines to ISO 31000
  - JIS Q 31010 - Risk management-Risk assessment techniques to ISO/IEC 31010

=== R ===
- Ceramics

=== S ===
- Domestic wares
  - JIS S 5037 – Sizing system for shoes to ISO 9407

=== T ===
- Medical equipment and safety appliances

=== W ===
- Aircraft and aviation
  - JIS W 0111 – Flight dynamics−Concepts, quantities and symbols−Part 1 : Aircraft motion relative to the air to ISO 1151-1
  - JIS W 0112 – Flight dynamics−Concepts, quantities and symbols−Part 2 : Motions of the aircraft and the atmosphere relative to the Earth to ISO 1151-2
  - JIS W 0113 – Flight dynamics−Concepts, quantities and symbols−Part 3 : Derivatives of forces, moments and their coefficients to ISO 1151-3
  - JIS W 0114 – Flight dynamics−Concepts, quantities and symbols−Part：4 Concepts, quantities and symbols used in the study of aircraft stability and control to ISO 1151-4
  - JIS W 0115 – Flight dynamics−Concepts, quantities and symbols−Part 5 : Quantities used in measurements to ISO 1151-5
  - JIS W 0116 – Flight dynamics−Concepts, quantities and symbols−Part 6 : Aircraft geometry to ISO 1151-6
  - JIS W 0117 – Flight dynamics−Concepts, quantities and symbols−Part 7 : Flight points and flight envelopes to ISO 1151-7
  - JIS W 0118 – Flight dynamics−Concepts, quantities and symbols−Part 8 : Concepts and quantities used in thestudy of the dynamic behaviour of the aircraft to ISO 1151-8
  - JIS W 0119 – Flight dynamics−Concepts, quantities and symbols−Part 9：Models of atmospheric motions along the trajectory of the aircraft to ISO 1151-9
  - JIS W 0125-1 – Aerospace−Fluid systems−Vocabulary−Part 1 : General terms and definitions relating to pressure to ISO 8625-1
  - JIS W 0125-2 – Aerospace−Fluid systems−Vocabulary−Part 2 : General terms and definitions relating to flow to ISO 8625-2
  - JIS W 0125-3 – Aerospace−Fluid systems−Vocabulary−Part 3 : General terms and definitions relating to temperature to ISO 8625-3

=== X ===
- Information processing
  - JIS X 0201:1997 – Japanese national variant of the ISO 646 7-bit character set
  - JIS X 0202:1998 – Japanese national standard which corresponds to the ISO 2022 character encoding
  - JIS X 0208:1997 – 7-bit and 8-bit double byte coded kanji sets for information interchange
  - JIS X 0212:1990 – Supplementary Japanese graphic character set for information interchange
  - JIS X 0213:2004 – 7-bit and 8-bit double byte coded extended Kanji sets for information interchange
  - JIS X 0221-1:2001 – Japanese national standard which corresponds to ISO 10646
  - JIS X 0401:1973 – Todofuken (prefecture) identification code
  - JIS X 0402:2003 – Identification code for cities, towns and villages
  - JIS X 0405:1994 – Commodity classification code
  - JIS X 0408:2004 – Identification code for universities and colleges
  - JIS X 0501:1985 – Bar code symbol for uniform commodity code
  - JIS X 0510:2004 – QR code
  - JIS X 3001-1:2009, JIS X 3001-2:2002, JIS X 3001-3:2000 – Fortran programming language
  - JIS X 3002:2001 – COBOL
  - JIS X 3005-1:2010 – SQL
  - JIS X 3010:2003 – C programming language
  - JIS X 3014:2003 – C++
  - JIS X 3017:2011, JIS X 3017:2013 – Programming languages – Ruby
  - JIS X 3030:1994 – POSIX - repealed in 2010
  - JIS X 4061:1996 – Collation of Japanese character string
  - JIS X 6002:1980 – Keyboard layout for information processing using the JIS 7 bit coded character set
  - JIS X 6054-1:1999 – MIDI
  - JIS X 6241:2004 – 120 mm DVD – Read-only disk
  - JIS X 6243:1998 – 120 mm DVD Rewritable Disk (DVD-RAM)
  - JIS X 6245:1999 – 80 mm (1.23 GB/side) and 120 mm (3.95 GB/side) DVD-Recordable-Disk (DVD-R)
  - JIS X 6302-6:2011 - Identification cards—Recording technique—Part 6: Magnetic stripe—High coercivity
  - JIS X 9051:1984 – 16-dots matrix character patterns for display devices
  - JIS X 9052:1983 – 24-dots matrix character patterns for dot printers

=== Z ===
- Miscellaneous
  - JIS Z 0310 – Abrasive blast-cleaning methods for surface preparation to ISO 8504
  - JIS Z 2241 – Metallic materials — Tensile testing — Method of test at room temperature to ISO 6892
  - JIS Z 2305 – Non-destructive testing-Qualification and certification of NDT personnel to ISO 9712
  - JIS Z 2371 – Methods of salt spray testing
  - JIS Z 3001-1 – Welding and allied processes -- Vocabulary -- Part 1: General
  - JIS Z 3001-2 – Welding and allied processes -- Vocabulary -- Part 2: Welding processes
  - JIS Z 3001-3 – Welding and allied processes -- Vocabulary -- Part 3: Soldering and brazing
  - JIS Z 3001-4 – Welding and allied processes -- Vocabulary -- Part 4: Imperfections in welding
  - JIS Z 3001-5 – Welding and allied processes -- Vocabulary -- Part 5: Laser welding
  - JIS Z 3001-6 – Welding and allied processes -- Vocabulary -- Part 6: Resistance welding
  - JIS Z 3001-7 – Welding and allied processes -- Vocabulary -- Part 7: Arc welding
  - JIS Z 3011 – Welding positions defined by means of angles of slope and rotation
  - JIS Z 3021 – Welding and allied processes -- Symbolic representation
  - JIS Z 8000-1 – Quantities and units -- Part 1: General
  - JIS Z 8000-2 – Quantities and units -- Part 2: Mathematics
  - JIS Z 8000-3 – Quantities and units -- Part 3: Space and time
  - JIS Z 8000-4 – Quantities and units -- Part 4: Mechanics
  - JIS Z 8000-5 – Quantities and units -- Part 5: Thermodynamics
  - JIS Z 8102 – Names of non-luminous object colours
  - JIS Z 8210 – Public Information Symbols
  - JIS Z 8301 – Rules for the layout and drafting of Japanese Industrial Standards
  - JIS Z 9098 – Hazard specific evacuation guidance sign system
  - JIS Z 9112 – Classification of fluorescent lamps and light emitting diodes by chromaticity and colour rendering property

== See also ==
- International Organization for Standardization (ISO)
- International Electrotechnical Commission (IEC)
- Japanese Agricultural Standards
- Korean Standards Association
- Japanese typographic symbols – gives the Unicode symbol for the Japanese industrial standard
- List of JIS categories (in Japanese)
