= BS 25999 =

BS was BSI's standard in the field of Business Continuity Management (BCM). It was withdrawn in 2012 (part 2) and 2013 (part 1) following the publication of the international standards ISO 22301 - ″Societal Security — Business continuity management systems — Requirements″ and ISO 22313 - ″Societal Security — Business continuity management systems — Guidance″

Upon its publication in 2007 BS 99 replaced PAS 56, a Publicly Available Specification, published in 2003 on the same subject.

== Structure ==
BS 99 was a Business Continuity Management (BCM) standard published by the British Standards Institution (BSI).

It had two parts;

- Part 1, "BS 99-1:2006 Business Continuity Management. Code of Practice", took the form of general guidance on the processes, principles and terminology recommended for BCM.
- Part 2, "BS 99-2:2007 Specification for Business Continuity Management", specified a set of requirements for implementing, operating and improving a BCM System (BCMS).

== Timelines ==
The first part of BS 99 (BS 99-1:2006) was published by the British Standards Institution in December 2006. The second part of BS 99 (BS 99-2:2007) was published in November 2007.

BS 99-2 was withdrawn in November 2012 having been replaced by the International Standard, ISO 22301. BS 99-1 was withdrawn in early 2013 having been replaced by ISO 22313.

== Development ==
Both parts of the standard contributed significantly to the international standards that succeeded then and to the development of other national and international standards (such as ASIS/BSI BCM.01:2010).

== Other related standards ==
There are a number of similar worldwide standards:

North America - Published by the National Fire Protection Association NFPA 1600: Standard on Disaster/Emergency Management and Business Continuity Programs.

ASIS/BSI BCM.01:2010 Business Continuity Management Systems: Requirements with Guidance for Use. Published in December 2010 and developed jointly between ASIS and BSI for North America

Australia - Published by Standards Australia HB 292-2006 : A practitioners guide to business continuity management HB 293-2006 : Executive guide to business continuity management AS/NZS 5050 : Business Continuity Managing disruption-related risk

== See also ==
- Information assurance
- Physical security
- Societal security

Standards Australia have published AS 5050:2010.
