= ISO 22396 =

Guidelines for information exchange between organizations

ISO 22396:2020, Security and resilience - Community resilience - Guidelines for information exchange between organizations, is an international standard developed by ISO/TC 292 Security and resilience and published by the International Organization for Standardization in 2020: ISO 22396 gives various of recommendations on how to exchange information between organizations. It is applicable to all types of organizations, both public and private. The recommendations include various of principles for information exchange as well as a framework and process on how to work.

== Scope and contents ==
ISO 22396 includes the following main clauses:

1. Scope
2. Normative references
3. Terms and definitions
4. Principles
5. Framework
6. Process

Annex A Traffic light protocol (TLP)
Annex B Examples

== Related standards ==
ISO 22396 is part of a series of standards on Community resilience. The other standards are:

- ISO 22315:2015 Societal security – Mass evacuation – Guidelines for planning
- ISO 22319:2017 Security and resilience – Community resilience – Guidelines for planning the involvement of spontaneous volunteers
- ISO 22392:2020 Security and resilience – Community resilience – Guidelines for conducting peer reviews
- ISO 22395:2018 Security and resilience – Community resilience – Guidelines for supporting vulnerable persons in an emergency

== History ==
Year	Description
2020	ISO 22396 (1st Edition)

== See also ==
- List of ISO standards
- International Organization for Standardization
