= ISO 22398 =

Security exercise standards

ISO 22398:2013, Societal security – Guidelines for exercises, is an international standard published by International Organization for Standardization that provide guidelines to be used for organizations that want to plan, conduct and improve exercises. The guidelines can also be used for a full exercise programme.

It can be used by all types and sizes of organizations, no matter whether they are private or public or what kind of business they operate .

== Scope and contents ==
ISO 22398 includes the following main clauses:

1. Scope
2. Normative references
3. Terms and definitions
4. Planning, conducting and improving an exercise programme
5. Planning, conducting and improving exercise projects
6. Continual improvement

Annex A Exercises within a management system description
Annex B Needs analysis
Annex C National strategic exercises
Annex D Exercise enhancement

== History ==
This standard was originally developed by ISO technical committee ISO/TC 223 on societal security and published for the first time in September 2013. ISO/TC 292 Security and resilience took over the responsibility of the work when ISO/TC 223 was dissolved and initiated a revision of the standard. The standard was last reviewed and confirmed in 2022, therefore version 22398:2013 remains current.

Year	Description
2013	ISO 22398 (1st edition)
2020	ISO 22398 (2nd edition was canceled in October 2022, thus the 1st edition remains current)

== See also ==
- List of ISO standards
- International Organization for Standardization
