= ISO/TC 292 =

ISO/TC 292 Security and resilience is a technical committee of the International Organization for Standardization formed in 2015 to develop standards in the area of security and resilience.

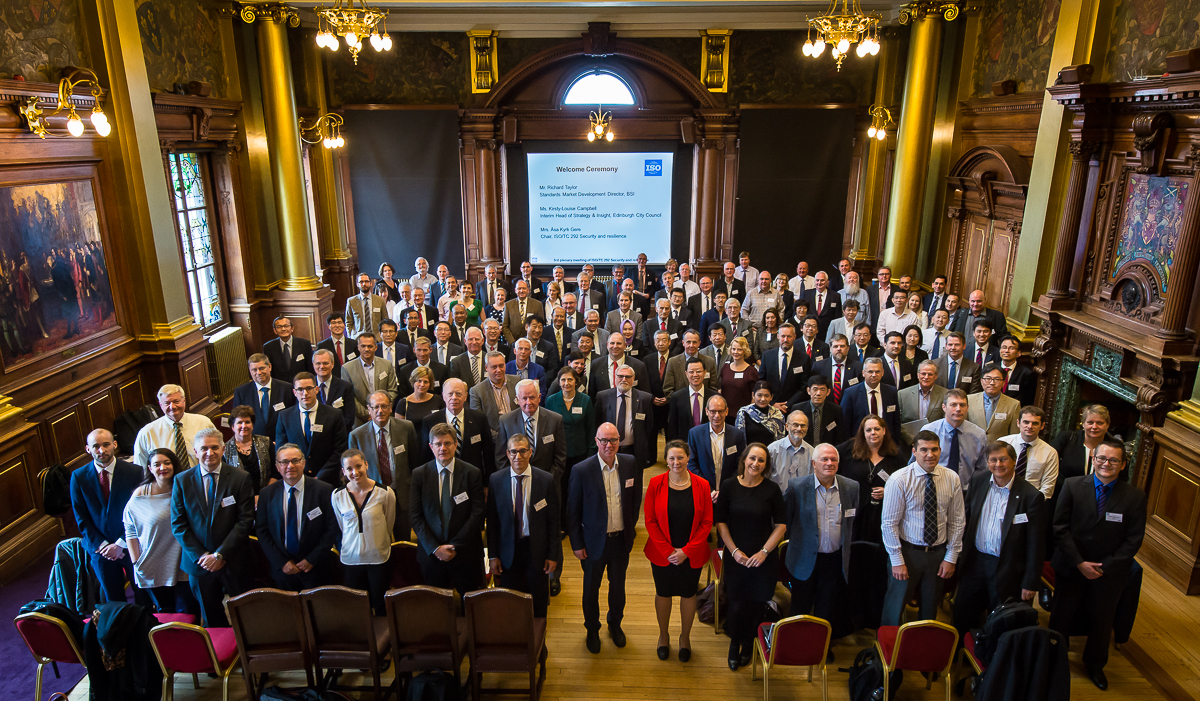
ISO/TC 292 at the 3rd plenary meeting in Edinburgh

When ISO/TC 292 was created the following three committees were merged.

- ISO/TC 223 Societal security (2001–2014)
- ISO/TC 247 Fraud countermeasures and controls (2009–2014)
- ISO/PC 284 Management system for quality of PSC operations (2013–2014)

== Scope ==
ISO/TC 292 works under the following scope

Standardization in the field of security to enhance the safety and resilience of society.
Excluded: Sector specific security projects developed in other relevant ISO committees and projects developed in ISO/TC 262 and ISO/PC 278.

== Leadership and organization ==
- Chair 2026– Ella Carlberg
- Chair 2024–2025 Karl Torring
- Chair 2015–2023 Åsa Kyrk Gere
- Secretary 2020- Susanna Björk
- Secretary 2017–2020 Bengt Rydstedt
- Secretary 2017-2017 Susanna Björk
- Secretary 2015–2016 Bengt Rydstedt

== Published standards ==
Stand-alone documents

- ISO 22300:2025 Security and resilience – Vocabulary (EN)
- ISO/TS 22375:2018 Security and resilience – Guidelines for complexity assessment process
- ISO 22379:2022 Security and resilience – Guidelines for hosting and organizing large citywide and regional events
- ISO 22397:2014 Societal security – Guidelines for establishing partnering arrangements (EN)
- ISO 22398:2014 Societal security – Guidelines for exercises

Business continuity management systems

- ISO 22301:2019 Security and resilience – Business continuity management systems – Requirements (EN)
- ISO 22313:2020 Security and resilience – Business continuity management systems – Guidance on the use of ISO 22301 (EN)
- ISO/TS 22317:2021 Security and resilience – Business continuity management systems – Guidelines for business impact analysis
- ISO/TS 22318:2021 Security and resilience – Business continuity management systems – Guidelines for supply chain continuity
- ISO/TS 22330:2018 Security and resilience – Business continuity management systems – Guidelines for people aspects on business continuity
- ISO/TS 22331:2018 Security and resilience – Business continuity management systems – Guidelines for business continuity strategy
- ISO/TS 22332:2021 Security and resilience – Business continuity management systems – Guidelines for developing business continuity plans and procedures
- ISO/IEC/TS 17021-6:2015 Conformity assessment – Requirements for bodies providing audit and certification of management systems – Part 6: Competence requirements for auditing and certification of business continuity management systems

Emergency management

- ISO 22320:2018 Security and resilience – Emergency management – Guidelines for incident management
- ISO 22322:2022 Security and resilience – Emergency management – Guidelines for public warning
- ISO 22324:2022 Security and resilience – Emergency management – Guidelines for colour coded alert(EN)
- ISO 22325:2016 Security and resilience – Emergency management – Guidelines for capability assessment
- ISO 22326:2018 Security and resilience – Emergency management – Guidelines for monitoring facilities with identified hazards
- ISO 22328-1:2020 Security and resilience – Emergency management – Part 1: General guidelines for implementation of a community-based natural disasters early warning system
- ISO 22328-2:2024 Security and resilience – Emergency management – Part 2: Guidelines for implementation of a community-based landslide early warning system
- ISO 22328-3:2022 Security and resilience – Emergency management – Part 3: Guidelines for implementation of a community-based tsunami early warning system
- ISO 22329:2021 Security and resilience – Emergency management – Guidelines for the use of social media in emergencies(EN)
- ISO/TR 22351:2015 Societal security – Emergency management – Message structure for exchange of information

Authenticity, integrity and trust for products and documents

- ISO 22373:2025 Security and resilience – Authenticity, integrity and trust for products and documents – Framework for establishing trustworthy supply and value chains
- ISO 22376:2023 Security and resilience – Authenticity, integrity and trust for products and documents – Specification and usage of visible digital seal (VDS) data format for authentication, verification and acquisition of data carried by a document or object
- ISO 22378:2022 Security and resilience – Authenticity, integrity and trust for products and documents – Guidelines for interoperable object identification and related authentication systems to deter counterfeiting and illicit trade
- ISO 22380:2018 Security and resilience – Authenticity, integrity and trust for products and documents – General principles for product fraud risk
- ISO 22381:2018 Security and resilience – Authenticity, integrity and trust for products and documents – Guidelines for interoperability of product identification and authentication systems
- ISO 22382:2018 Security and resilience – Authenticity, integrity and trust for products and documents – Guidelines for the content, security and issuance of excise tax stamps
- ISO 22383:2020 Security and resilience – Authenticity, integrity and trust for products and documents – Guidelines and performance criteria for authentication solutions for material goods
- ISO 22384:2020 Security and resilience – Authenticity, integrity and trust for products and documents - Guidelines to establish and monitor a protection plan and its implementation
- ISO 22385:2023 Security and resilience – Authenticity, integrity and trust for products and documents - Guidelines to establish a framework for trust and interoperability
- ISO/TS 22386:2024 Security and resilience – Authenticity, integrity and trust for products and documents - Guidelines for brand protection and enforcement procedures
- ISO 22387:2022 Security and resilience – Authenticity, integrity and trust for products and documents - Validation procedures for the application of artefact metrics
- ISO 22388:2023 Security and resilience – Authenticity, integrity and trust for products and documents - Guidelines for securing physical documents

Community resilience

- ISO 22315:2015 Societal security – Mass evacuation – Guidelines for planning (EN)
- ISO 22319:2017 Security and resilience – Community resilience – Guidelines for planning the involvement of spontaneous volunteers
- ISO 22354:2026 Security and resilience — Societal resilience — Guidelines to develop local resilience capability
- ISO 22366:2026 Security and resilience – Community resilience – Framework and principles for energy resilience
- ISO/TR 22370:2020 Security and resilience – Urban resilience – Framework and principles
- ISO 22371:2024 Security and resilience – Community resilience – Principles, framework and guidelines on urban resilience
- ISO 22372:2025 Security and resilience – Community resilience — Guidelines for infrastructure resilience
- ISO 22392:2020 Security and resilience – Community resilience – Guidelines for conducting peer reviews
- ISO 22393:2023 Security and resilience – Community resilience – Guidelines for planning recovery and renewal
- ISO 22395:2018 Security and resilience – Community resilience – Guidelines for supporting vulnerable persons in an emergency
- ISO 22396:2020 Security and resilience – Community resilience – Guidelines for information exchange between organisations

Organizational resilience

- ISO 22316:2017 Security and resilience – Organizational resilience – Principles and attributes
- ISO 22336:2024 Security and resilience – Organizational resilience – Guidelines for resilience policy and strategy

Security management systems

- ISO 28000:2022 Security and resilience – Security management systems – Requirements
- ISO 28001:2007 Security management systems for the supply chain – Best practices for implementing supply chain security, assessments and plans – Requirements and guidance
- ISO 28003:2007 Security management systems for the supply chain – Requirements for bodies providing audit and certification of supply chain security management systems
- ISO 28004-1:2007 Security management systems for the supply chain – Guidelines for the implementation of ISO 28000 Part 1: General principles
- ISO 28004-3:2014 Security management systems for the supply chain – Guidelines for the implementation of ISO 28000 Part 3: Additional specific guidance for adopting ISO 28000 for use by medium and small businesses (other than marine ports)
- ISO 28004-4:2014 Security management systems for the supply chain – Guidelines for the implementation of ISO 28000 Part 4: Additional specific guidance on implementing ISO 28000 if compliance with ISO 28001 is a management objective
- ISO 18788:2015 Management system for private security operations – Requirements with guidance for use

Protective security

- ISO 22340:2024 Security and resilience – Protective security – Guidelines for an enterprise protective security architecture and framework
- ISO 22341:2021 Security and resilience – Protective security – Guidelines for crime prevention through environmental design
- ISO 22342:2023 Security and resilience – Protective security – Guidelines for the development of a security plan for an organization

Vehicle security barriers

- ISO 22343-1:2023 Security and resilience – Vehicle security barriers — Part 1: Performance requirement, vehicle impact test method and performance rating
- ISO 22343-2:2023 Security and resilience – Vehicle security barriers — Part 2: Application

Hardened protective shelters

- ISO 22359:2024 Security and resilience – Guidelines for hardened protective shelters (EN)
- ISO/TS 22359-2:2026 Security and resilience – Hardened protective shelters – Part 2: Requirements for shelter protective equipment

Crisis management

- ISO/TS 22360:2024 Security and resilience – Crisis management – Concepts, principles and framework
- ISO 22361:2024 Security and resilience – Crisis management – Guidelines (EN)

Replaced or withdrawn

- ISO 22300:2012 Societal security – Terminology (replaced by 2018 edition)
- ISO 22300:2018 Security and resilience – Vocabulary (replaced by 2021 edition)
- ISO 22300:2021 Security and resilience – Vocabulary (replaced by 2025 edition)
- ISO 22301:2012 Societal security – Business continuity management systems – Requirements (replaced by 2019 edition)
- ISO/TR 22312:2012 Societal security – Technological capabilities
- ISO 22313:2012 Societal security – Business continuity management systems – Guidance (replaced by 2020 edition)
- ISO/TS 22317:2015 Societal security – Business continuity management systems – Guidelines for business impact analysis (replaced by 2021 edition)
- ISO/TS 22318:2015 Societal security – Business continuity management systems – Guidelines for supply chain continuity (replaced by 2021 edition)
- ISO 22320:2011 Societal security – Emergency management – Requirements for incident response (replaced by 2018 edition)
- ISO 22322:2015 Societal security – Emergency management – Guidelines for public warning (replaced by 2022 edition)
- ISO 22324:2015 Societal security – Emergency management – Guidelines for colour coded alert (replaced by 2022 edition)
- ISO 22327:2018 Security and resilience – Emergency management – Guidelines for implementation of a community-based landslide early warning system(replaced by ISO 22328-1)
- ISO/TS 22393:2021 Security and resilience – Community resilience – Guidelines for planning recovery and renewal(replaced by 2023 edition)
- ISO/PAS 22399:2007 Societal security – Guideline for incident preparedness and operational continuity management (replaced by ISO 22301 and ISO 22313)
- ISO 12931:2012 Performance criteria for authentication solutions used to combat counterfeiting of material goods (replaced by ISO 22380)
- ISO 16678:2014 Guidelines for interoperable object identification and related authentication systems to deter counterfeiting and illicit trade (replaced by ISO 22381)
- ISO 28000:2007 Specification for security management systems for the supply chain(replaced by 2022 edition)
- ISO 28002:2011 Security management systems for the supply chain – Development of resilience in the supply chain – Requirements with guidance for use

(EN)=Adopted by CEN as European standard

== History ==
- In 2015, ISO/TC 292 held its 1st plenary meeting March 9-13 in Morioka, Japan and its 2nd plenary meeting on Bali in Indonesia. WG 1-6 were established together with a Communication group and a Developing country contact group. ISO/TS 22317, ISO/TS 22318, ISO 22322, ISO 22324, ISO/TR 22351 and ISO 18788 were published.
- In 2016, a Strategic Business Plan for the committee was developed and approved by ISOs Technical Management Board. Various of roads maps for the committee work were agreed . The term “societal security” was abandoned and replaced by ”security and resilience” for the standards development. UK hosted the 3rd plenary meeting of the committee in Edinburgh. ISO 22325 was published.
- In 2017, the 4th plenary meeting was held 24-28 April in Jeju, Korea. ISO 22316 and ISO 22319 were published.
- In 2018, the 5th plenary meeting was held 11-16 March in Sydney, Australia and the 6th was held 7-12 October in Stavanger, Norway. WG 7 Event management was established. ISO 22300 (2nd ed), ISO 22320 (2nd ed), ISO 22326, ISO 22327, ISO/TS 22330, ISO/TS 22331, ISO/TS 22375, ISO 22380, ISO 22381, ISO 22302 and ISO 22395 were published.
- In 2019, the 7th plenary meeting was held 8-13 September in Bangkok, Thailand. WG 8 Supply chain security and WG 9 Crisis management were established. ISO 22301 (2nd ed) was published.
- In 2020, the plenary meeting was planned to be organized in Berlin but was postponed because of the Covid-19 pandemic. ISO 22313 (2nd ed), ISO 22328-1, ISO 22383, ISO 22384, ISO/TR 22370, ISO 22392 and ISO 22396 were published.
- In 2021, the 8th plenary meeting was held virtually. WG 10 Preparedness was established. ISO 22300 (3rd ed), ISO/TS 22317 (2nd ed), ISO/TS 22318 (2nd ed), ISO 22329 and ISO/TS 22332 were published.
- In 2022, the 9th plenary meeting was held virtually. ISO 22322 (2nd ed), ISO 22324 (2nd ed), ISO 22328-3, ISO 22378, ISO 22379, ISO 22387 and ISO 28000 (2nd ed) were published.
- In 2023, the 10th plenary meeting was held virtually. WG 3 was cancelled since the core area Emergency management was established as SC 1. At the end of the year, Mrs Åsa Kyrk Gere resigned as chair after serving the maximum time allowed. ISO 22371, ISO 22376, ISO 22385 and ISO 22388 were published.
- In 2024, Mr Karl Torring was appointed as new chair for ISO/TC 292. After several years of digital work, due to the Covid-19 pandemic, the 11th plenary meeting was held physically in Liverpool, UK. ISO 22328-2, ISO 22336, ISO 22340, ISO 22359, ISO/TS 22360, ISO 22361, ISO 22371 and ISO /TS 22386 were published.
- In 2025, ISO 22300 (4th ed), ISO 22341-2, ISO 22372, ISO 22373 were published.
- In 2026, Ms Ella Carlberg was appointed as new chair for ISO/TC 292. The 12th plenary meeting was held physically in Berlin, Germany. ISO 22354 and ISO 22366 were published.
