= ISO 22319 =

Guidelines for managing spontaneous volunteers

ISO 22319:2017, Security and resilience - Community resilience - Guidelines for planning the involvement of spontaneous volunteers, is an international standard developed by ISO/TC 292 Security and resilience and published by the International Organization for Standardization in 2017. ISO 22317 gives various of recommendations on how to deal with spontaneous volunteers (SVs) that show up at the incident scene to help the official emergency management team. When emergencies happen, concerned citizens want to help out in many ways. Following a disaster or crisis, members of the public often show up and offer their help. These spontaneous volunteers are not usually part of an organized volunteer organization such Search and Rescue Teams or the Humanitarian groups and may not have any training or experience as a volunteer. However, these volunteers can make very valuable contributions to the emergency response. But they can also present challenges for the emergency managers who may not be prepared for these volunteers. The purpose of this standard is to help organizations plan for the participation of spontaneous volunteers and to manage their work effectively and safely. .

== Scope and contents ==
ISO 22319 includes the following main clauses:

1. Scope
2. Normative references
3. Terms and definitions
4. Preparatory measures
5. Planning for the involvement of SVs
6. Longer-term issues

Some of the topics covered in the Standard include: • Challenges and benefits spontaneous volunteers bring to an emergency • How to plan for these volunteers and how to manage their involvement • Some of the risks associated with using volunteers in an emergency • How to implement a volunteer management plan • How to communicate with the public and volunteers • How to evaluate the impact of these volunteers during the emergency and the longer term recovery

== Related standards ==
ISO 22319 is part of a series of standards on Community resilience. The other standards are:

- ISO 22315:2015 Societal security – Mass evacuation – Guidelines for planning
- ISO 22392:2020 Security and resilience – Community resilience – Guidelines for conducting peer reviews
- ISO 22395:2018 Security and resilience – Community resilience – Guidelines for supporting vulnerable persons in an emergency
- ISO 22396:2020 Security and resilience – Community resilience – Guidelines for information exchange between organisations

== History ==
Year	Description
2017	ISO 22319 (1st Edition)

== See also ==
- List of ISO standards
- International Organization for Standardization
