= ISO 22382 =

International tax stamp standard

ISO 22382:2018 Security and resilience – Authenticity, integrity and trust for products and documents – Guidelines for the content, security and issuance of excise tax stamps, is an international standard developed by ISO/TC 292 Security and resilience and published by the International Organization for Standardization in 2018.
ISO 22382 is a guidance document that provides various of recommendations for the content, security, issuance and examination of physical tax stamps. The purpose of the standard is to avoid counterfeited products and ensure that the required taxes have been paid for, for example on items as tobacco and alcohol. The recommendations includes:

- how to design and construct a tax stamp and its functions, security features, applications processes, unique identifier codes
- the process itself with identifying and consulting with stakeholders, selection of suppliers, monitoring and assessment

== Scope and contents ==
ISO 22382 includes the following main clauses:

1. Scope
2. Normative references
3. Terms and definitions
4. Process overview
5. Identify and consult stakeholders
6. Functions of a tax stamp
7. Procurement process
8. Tax stamp construction
9. Finishing and application of tax stamps
10. Tax stamp supply and distribution security
11. Serialization and unique identifiers
12. Examination of tax stamps
13. Monitoring and assessment

Annex A Request for proposal
Annex B Design and construction
Annex C Substrate materials
Annex D Comparison of substrate-based tax stamps and direct marking
Annex E Authentication features
Annex F Examples of printing techniques
Annex G Authentication tools and usage

== Related standards ==
ISO 22382 is part a series of documents on Authenticity, integrity and trust for products and documents , including

- ISO 22380:2018 Security and resilience – Authenticity, integrity and trust for products and documents – General principles for product fraud risk
- ISO 22381:2018 Security and resilience – Authenticity, integrity and trust for products and documents – Guidelines for interoperability of product identification and authentication systems
- ISO 12931:2012 Performance criteria for authentication solutions used to combat counterfeiting of material goods
- ISO 16678:2014 Guidelines for interoperable object identification and related authentication systems to deter counterfeiting and illicit trade

== History ==
ISO 22382 was first being developed in ISO/TC 247 Fraud countermeasures and controls under the number ISO 19998. The standard got a new number when ISO/TC 247 was merged into ISO/TC 292 in 2015.

Year	Description
2018	ISO 22322 (1st Edition)

== See also ==
- List of ISO standards
- International Organization for Standardization
