= ISO 22395 =

Guidelines for supporting vulnerable persons

ISO 22395:2018, Security and resilience -- Community resilience -- Guidelines for supporting vulnerable persons in an emergency, is an international standard developed by ISO/TC 292 Security and resilience and published by the International Organization for Standardization in October 2018. This document is a voluntary guidance standard for supporting vulnerable persons in an emergency.

== Background and purpose ==
When emergencies strike, it is important that people are safe. However, some people are at more risk during an emergency. Traditionally, the focus has been on the special needs of children, the elderly and persons with disabilities. However, this is a narrow definition of vulnerability. Increasingly, communities are taking a more holistic view and are looking to address the needs of persons who are socially isolated, lacking language skills, impoverished or marginalized.

This international standard provides guidance on types of vulnerability and how to address the needs of people in vulnerable situations in an emergency. It provides recommendations on how to develop an overall plan. It also provides practical tips and strategies for moving vulnerable people from an affected area, providing support, long term recovery, and communication with affected persons and community stakeholders. The standard gives recommendations on how to evaluate the processes to support vulnerable people and how to continually improve the overall plan going forward.

== Scope and contents ==
ISO 22395 includes the following main clauses:

1. Scope
2. Normative references
3. Terms and definitions
4. Identifying vulnerable persons in an emergency
5. Communicating with vulnerable persons in an emergency
6. Providing support for vulnerable persons in an emergency
7. Implementing, reviewing and improving

== Topics covered by ISO 22395 ==
- What is vulnerability and how do you identify vulnerable people as part of emergency planning;
- How to develop processes and procedures to address the needs of vulnerable people as part of emergency planning
- Recommendations on communicating with vulnerable people during an emergency
- Practical tips on emergency shelter, transportation, financial support and health services
- How to evaluate and improve policies and procedures for vulnerable people in emergencies

== Related standards ==
ISO 22395 is part of a series of standards on Community resilience. The other standards are:

- ISO 22315:2015 Societal security – Mass evacuation – Guidelines for planning
- ISO 22319:2017 Security and resilience – Community resilience – Guidelines for planning the involvement of spontaneous volunteers
- ISO 22392:2020 Security and resilience – Community resilience – Guidelines for conducting peer reviews
- ISO 22396:2020 Security and resilience – Community resilience – Guidelines for information exchange between organisations

== History ==
Year	Description
2018	ISO 22395 (1st Edition)

== See also ==
- List of ISO standards
- International Organization for Standardization
