= Japanese Standards Association =

- Native name: 日本規格協会
- Company type: general incorporated foundation
- Founded: 1945
- Headquarters: Tokyo, Japan
- Products: standards and standards related services
- Website: jsa.or.jp

Japanese Standards Association (一般財団法人日本規格協会, Ippan-zaidanhōjin Nihon Kikaku Kyōkai; JSA) is the Japanese industrial standard development organization. JSA promotes standardization and management system in Japan through the following activities:

- Development of national standards (JIS)
- Support of international standardization activities related to ISO, IEC
- Dissemination of standards
- Support of developing human resources in standardization and management system
- Conduct of Quality Management and Quality Control Certificate Examination
- Promotion of conformity assessment

== History ==
1945 December 6 : The Dai Nihon Aerial Technology Association and the Japan Management Association merged to form the Japanese Standards Association (JSA). JSA was authorized to incorporate by the Minister of Trade and Industry (now known as the Minister of Economy, Trade and Industry). Its office was first established at the Patent and Standards Bureau in Chiyoda-ku, Tokyo.
1946 : The first issue of "Industrial Standards and Standardization" was published.
1949 : The first Quality Control (QC) seminar in Japan was held in June.
1950 : Publication of JIS commenced.
1951 : Drafting of JIS began.
1952 : The Head Office moved to Ginza Kobiki-cho, Chūō-ku, Tokyo.
1958 : The first National Meeting of Standardization was held.
1963 : The construction of JSA building was completed in Akasaka, Minato-ku, Tokyo.
1970 : The monthly magazine “Standardization Journal” was launched.
1994 : JSA Quality management system center was accredited by The Japan Accreditation Board for Conformity Assessment (JAB) as a registration body.
2002 : JSA Web Store opened.
2005 : The first Quality Management and Quality Control Certificate Examination was conducted.
2012 : The form of organization shifted from public interest incorporated foundation to the general incorporated foundation.
2013 : The Head Office moved to Mita, Minato-ku, Tokyo.

== Standards ==
JSA develops draft JIS, and publishes and distributes JIS. Usually, about 600 JIS are developed annually. Most of which are co-developed by JSA and other Industrial Associations based on a contract. Moreover, JSA itself conducts research activities and develops JIS that is related to consumer protection, units and graphical symbols which are basic and common in many different fields and management system etc.
JSA supports other Industrial Associations to propose JIS to ISO, and IEC as draft International Standard (IS).

== See also ==
- Japanese Industrial Standards
- Japanese Industrial Standards Committee
- International Organization for Standardization
- International Electrotechnical Commission
