= ISO 22392 =

Standards for conducting peer reviews

ISO 22392:2020, Security and resilience - Community resilience - Guidelines for conducting peer reviews, is an international standard developed by ISO/TC 292 Security and resilience and published by the International Organization for Standardization in 2020: ISO 22392 gives various of recommendations on how to conduct peer reviews of community resilience and design a peer review tool to assess community preparedness for disasters.

== Scope and contents ==
ISO 22392 includes the following main clauses:

1. Scope
2. Normative references
3. Terms and definitions
4. Plan the peer review
5. Conduct the peer review
6. Assess the impact of the peer review
7. Improve the process of the peer review

Annex A Example tasks to be conducted before, during and after the peer review visit
Annex B Descriptions of analysis areas to be peer-reviewed
Annex C Example of an evidence-recording template
Annex D Example peer review visit timetable
Annex E Generic discussion points and questions to ask about each analysis area
Annex F Example form for reviewer to record information

== Related standards ==
ISO 22392 is part of a series of standards on Community resilience. The other standards are:

- ISO 22315:2015 Societal security – Mass evacuation – Guidelines for planning
- ISO 22319:2017 Security and resilience – Community resilience – Guidelines for planning the involvement of spontaneous volunteers
- ISO 22395:2018 Security and resilience – Community resilience – Guidelines for supporting vulnerable persons in an emergency
- ISO 22396:2020 Security and resilience – Community resilience – Guidelines for information exchange between organisations

== History ==
Year	Description
2020	ISO 22392 (1st Edition)

== See also ==
- List of ISO standards
