= ISO 22381 =

ISO 22381:2018 Security and resilience – Authenticity, integrity and trust for products and documents – Guidelines for establishing interoperability among object identification systems to deter counterfeiting and illicit trade, is an international standard developed by ISO/TC 292 Security and resilience and published by the International Organization for Standardization in 2018. ISO 22381 is a guidance document that provides various of recommendations for establishing interoperability among independently functioning product identification and related authentication systems, as described in ISO 16678.

== Scope and contents ==
ISO 22381 includes the following main clauses:

1. Scope
2. Normative references
3. Terms and definitions
4. Abbreviated terms
5. Planning, implementing and controlling systems’ interoperability
- 5.1 Identify stakeholders and their needs
- 5.2 Organize stakeholders
- 5.3 Plan architecture
- 5.4 Plan and implement operations
- 5.5 Review and improve

Annex A Typical stakeholder interests in an I-OP
Annex B The role of trusted entry points for user groups
Annex C Types of information exchanged in I-OP architectures

== Related standards ==
ISO 22381 is part a series of documents on Authenticity, integrity and trust for products and documents, including

- ISO 22380:2018 Security and resilience – Authenticity, integrity and trust for products and documents – General principles for product fraud risk
- ISO 22382:2018 Security and resilience – Authenticity, integrity and trust for products and documents – Guidelines for the content, security and issuance of excise tax stamps
- ISO 12931:2012 Performance criteria for authentication solutions used to combat counterfeiting of material goods
- ISO 16678:2014 Guidelines for interoperable object identification and related authentication systems to deter counterfeiting and illicit trade

== History ==
ISO 22381 was first being developed in ISO/TC 247 Fraud countermeasures and controls under the number ISO 20229. The standard got a new number when ISO/TC 247 was merged into ISO/TC 292 in 2015.

Year	Description
2018	ISO 22381 (1st Edition)

== See also ==
- List of ISO standards
- International Organization for Standardization
