= NFPA 1600 =

NFPA 1600 (Standard on Disaster/Emergency Management and Business Continuity/Continuity of Operations Programs) is a standard published by the National Fire Protection Association.
