= ISO 22322 =

International security standard

ISO 22322:2022 (Security and resilience - Emergency management – Guidelines for public warning) is an international standard developed by the ISO/TC 292 Security and Resilience committee. It was published by the International Organization for Standardization (ISO) in 2015.

ISO 22322 provides guidelines for developing and issuing public warnings before, during, and after emergencies. It describes the best methods for issuing a public warning, and guidelines for such warnings. The standard ensures that the public will pay attention to a security alert, take appropriate safety measures, and seek additional information on how to respond to an emergency.

Risks and consequences of potential hazards are assessed before planning and implementing the public warning system (that assessment is outside the scope of ISO 22322). A severe emergency might necessitate any effective medium to alert people at risk. The standard is applicable to any organization, domestic or international, that is responsible for issuing public warnings.

== Scope and contents ==
ISO 22322 includes the following main clauses:

1. Scope
2. Normative references
3. Terms and definitions
4. Public warning system
  - General
  - Design the framework
  - Identify public warning objectives
  - Implement the public warning process
  - Evaluate and improve
5. Public warning process.
  - General
  - Hazard monitoring process
  - Operational decision-making
  - Warning dissemination process
  - Human factor considerations
- Annex A: Relationship between alert and notification in public warnings
- Annex B: Public awareness

== Purpose ==
In the case of major incidents such as natural disasters and terrorist attacks, an effective public response will save lives, mitigate harm, minimize damage, and prevent major disruption. Efficient public warning systems facilitate such a response by enabling emergency response organizations to prepare and respond quickly to a developing situation. When time is limited, it is beneficial to have already prepared a method to disseminate a specific message to a large group.

Public warning preparedness is based on two functions: hazard monitoring and alert dissemination. Effective public warning systems based on ISO 22322 serve to prevent panic reactions and allow the public to take necessary action to prepare for an emergency.

== Related standards ==
ISO 22322 is part of a series of documents on emergency management:

- ISO 22320:2018 Security and resilience – Emergency management – Guidelines for incident management
- ISO 22324:2022 Security and resilience – Emergency management – Guidelines for color coded alert
- ISO 22325:2016 Security and resilience – Emergency management – Guidelines for capability assessment
- ISO 22326:2018 Security and resilience – Emergency management – Guidelines for monitoring facilities with identified hazards
- ISO/TR 22351:2015 Societal security – Emergency management – Message structure for exchange of information

== History ==
This standard was published for the first time in 2015.

Edition	Release date	Changes from previous ed	Project leader
ISO 22322 (1st edition)	2015	-	Haruo Hayashi
ISO 22322 (2nd edition)	2022	-	Haruo Hayashi

== See also ==
- International Organization for Standardization
- List of ISO standards
