= ISO 22315 =

Guidelines for mass evacuation

ISO 22315:2014 Societal security – Mass evacuation – Guidelines for planning, is an international standard developed by ISO/TC 292 Security and resilience and published by the International Organization for Standardization in 2014. ISO 22315 gives various of recommendations on how to plan for possible mass evacuations, for example a city. The standard includes guidance on the various phases of mass evacuation from how to prepare the public, take the decision for evacuation to analyzing the evacuee movement and assessing the shelter where the evacuees is put.

== Scope and contents ==
ISO 22315 includes the following main clauses:

1. Scope
2. Normative references
3. Terms and definitions
4. General aspects for mass evacuation planning
5. Prepare the public for mass evacuation
6. Visualize the areas that are at risk or affected
7. Make the evacuation decision
8. Public warning
9. Analyse evacuee movement
10. Assess evacuee shelter requirements

== Related standards ==
ISO 22315 is part of a series of standards on Community resilience. The other standards are:

- ISO 22319:2017 Security and resilience – Community resilience – Guidelines for planning the involvement of spontaneous volunteers
- ISO 22392:2020 Security and resilience – Community resilience – Guidelines for conducting peer reviews
- ISO 22395:2018 Security and resilience – Community resilience – Guidelines for supporting vulnerable persons in an emergency
- ISO 22396:2020 Security and resilience – Community resilience – Guidelines for information exchange between organisations

== History ==
Year	Description
2014	ISO 22315 (1st Edition)

== See also ==
- List of ISO standards
- International Organization for Standardization
