= ISO 22320 =

ISO 22320:2018, Security and resilience - Emergency management - Guidelines for incident management, is an international standard published by International Organization for Standardization that provide guidelines to be used for organizations that helps to mitigate threats and deal with incidents to ensure continuity of basic function of society (for example water and food supplies, health, rescue services, fuel delivery, and electricity). ISO 22320 can be used by all types and sizes of organizations, no matter whether they are private or public but it is mostly focused on national emergency management organizations.

== Scope and contents ==
ISO 22320 includes the following main clauses:

1. Scope
2. Normative references
3. Terms and definitions
4. Principles
5. Incident management
6. Working together

Annex A Additional guidance on working together
Annex B Additional guidance on incident management structure
Annex C Examples of incident management tasks
Annex D Incident management planning

== Related standards ==
ISO 22320 is the first of a series of ISO standards and Technical Reports on Emergency management, including

- ISO 22322:2022 Security and resilience – Emergency management – Guidelines for public warning
- ISO 22324:2022 Security and resilience – Emergency management – Guidelines for colour coded alert
- ISO 22325:2016 Security and resilience – Emergency management – Guidelines for capability assessment
- ISO 22326:2018 Security and resilience – Emergency management – Guidelines for monitoring facilities with identified hazards
- ISO/TR 22351:2015 Societal security – Emergency management – Message structure for exchange of information

== History ==
This standard was originally developed by ISO technical committee ISO/TC 223 on societal security and published for the first time in November 2011. ISO/TC 292 Security and resilience took over the responsibility of the work when ISO/TC 223 was dissolved and initiated a revision of the standard.

| Year | Description |
|---|---|
| 2011 | ISO 22320 (1st edition) |
| 2018 | ISO 22320 (2nd edition). The document changed from being requirements to recommendations. |

== See also ==
- List of ISO standards
- International Organization for Standardization
