= ISO 22324 =

ISO 22324:2022, Security and resilience — Emergency management — Guidelines for colour-coded alerts, is an international standard developed by ISO/TC 292 Security and resilience. This document provide guidelines for color codes to indicate severity of hazards in public warnings.

There are many different systems are already in use, such as colour state of meteorological condition or former Homeland Security Advisory System, and the standard is intended to be an approach to eliminate confusion due to such differences.

== Scope and contents ==
ISO 22324 includes the following main clauses:

1 Scope
2 Normative references
3 Terms and definitions
4 Guidance for use of colour codes
4.1 General
4.2 Colour codes to express the status of hazard
4.3 Colour codes to give supplementary information
4.4 Consideration for human factors and colour blindness
Annex A Examples on the use of colour codes in practice
Annex B Recommendations for colour selection

=== Color codes for severity level ===
Three basic color codes for severity levels are defined with meaning and proposed action, as in following table.

Basic color codes
| Color | Text color | Meaning | Proposed action |
|---|---|---|---|
| Red | White | Danger | Take appropriate safety action immediately |
| Yellow | Black | Caution | Prepare to take appropriate safety action |
| Green | White | Safe | No action required |

If more than three levels of hazards are needed, the standard recommends use of colors on the spectrum between the red and green. The number of levels should be minimized to avoid confusion, not to exceed seven colors.

Diversity of human limitation of ability to recognize color, including color blindness, should be paid attention when a color code system is brought into operation. The standard recommends to pay special care to provide supporting information, such as:

- text (recommended color is shown in the table), numbers, shape, symbol or size
- audible color name, such as audible "red alert" voice
- positional cues i.e. colors should always be placed in a certain defined order in increasing levels of severity, such as left to right or bottom to top

=== Color codes for supplementary information ===
The standard gives additional color codes for supplementary information, defined with meaning and usage limitation, as in following table.

| Color | Text color | Meaning | Usage |
|---|---|---|---|
| Black | White | Fatal danger | Can be used with red; can be replaced by black-and-white checkerboard pattern |
| Purple | White | Fatal danger | Can be used with red |
| Blue | White | Informational purposes | Should not be used to indicate level of severity |
| Grey | | No information available | To indicate no information is available |

Black and purple can be used to indicate special cases of danger, i.e. red color code, thus supporting information such as text (recommended color shown in table above) is also recommended.

An example is the sequence black–red–yellow–green, used in triage tag in most part of the world.

=== Recommended Color Selection ===
The Annex B (informational) of the standard gives recommended selection of color for above-defined color codes. Each color code has saturated and unsaturated cases, both defined in Munsell, CMYK, and RGB systems.

== Related standards ==
ISO 22324 is part of a series of ISO standards and Technical Reports on Emergency management, including

- ISO 22320:2018 Security and resilience – Emergency management – Guidelines for incident management
- ISO 22322:2022 Security and resilience – Emergency management – Guidelines for public warning
- ISO 22325:2016 Security and resilience – Emergency management – Guidelines for capability assessment
- ISO 22326:2018 Security and resilience – Emergency management – Guidelines for monitoring facilities with identified hazards
- ISO 22327:2018 Security and resilience – Emergency management – Guidelines for implementation of a community-based landslide early warning system
- ISO/TR 22351:2015 Societal security – Emergency management – Message structure for exchange of information

== History ==
This standard was published for the first time in 2015.

| Year | Description |
|---|---|
| 2015 | ISO 22324 (1st edition) |
| 2022 | ISO 22324 (2nd edition) |
