= ISO 22301 =

International standard for business continuity management systems

ISO 22301 is an international standard for business continuity management systems. It was developed in March 2012 by International Organization for Standardization. The goal of the standard is to specify requirements to plan, establish, implement, operate, monitor, review, maintain and continually improve a documented management system to protect against, reduce the likelihood of occurrence, prepare for, respond to, and recover from disruptive incidents when they arise. The standard was designed to fit into an integrated management system. It is intended to be applicable to all organizations, or parts thereof, regardless of type, size and nature of the organization.

Organizations that implement a business continuity management system (BCMS) based on the requirements of ISO 22301 can undergo a formal assessment process through which they can obtain accredited certification against this standard. A certified BCMS demonstrates to internal and external stakeholders that the organization is adhering to good practices in business continuity management.

== Scope and contents ==
Similar to other management system standards by ISO, the requirements specified in ISO 22301 are generic and intended to be applicable to all organizations, regardless of type, size, and industry. However, the extent of applicability of the requirements depends on the organization's environment and complexity.

ISO 22301 is divided into 10 main clauses and has adopted the high-level structure and standardized text set out by Annex SL.

The standard is divided as follows:

1. Scope
2. Normative references
3. Terms and definitions
4. Context
5. Leadership
6. Planning
7. Support
8. Operation
9. Performance evaluation
10. Improvement

The high-level structure of ISO 22301, shared with other ISO management systems standards, such as ISO/IEC 27001, ISO 9001, ISO/IEC 20000-1, create a consistency which can help organizations integrate several management systems. This can help organizations improve efficiency, eliminate duplication, and achieve cost savings.

== Related standards ==
ISO 22301 is the first of a series of ISO standards and Technical Specifications on Business continuity management, including

- ISO 22300:2021 Security and resilience – Vocabulary
- ISO 22313:2020 Security and resilience – Business continuity management systems – Guidance on the use of ISO 22301
- ISO/TS 22317:2021 Security and resilience – Business continuity management systems – Guidelines for business impact analysis
- ISO/TS 22318:2021 Security and resilience – Business continuity management systems – Guidelines for supply chain continuity
- ISO/TS 22330:2018 Security and resilience – Business continuity management systems – Guidelines for people aspects on business continuity
- ISO/TS 22331:2018 Security and resilience – Business continuity management systems – Guidelines for business continuity strategy
- ISO/TS 22332:2021 Security and resilience – Business continuity management systems – Guidelines for developing business continuity plans and procedures
- ISO/IEC/TS 17021-6:2015 Conformity assessment – Requirements for bodies providing audit and certification of management systems – Part 6: Competence requirements for auditing and certification of business continuity management systems

== Versions ==
This standard was originally developed by ISO technical committee ISO/TC 223 on societal security and published for the first time in May 2012. ISO 22301:2012 was the first published ISO standard that had fully adopted the new format for writing management system standards described in Annex SL. ISO/TC 292 Security and resilience took over the responsibility of the work when ISO/TC 223 was dissolved and initiated a revision of the standard. The 2nd edition was published on 31 October, 2019, essentially consisting in refactoring the text of the standard to avoid repetitions.

| Year | Description |
|---|---|
| 2012 | ISO 22301 (1st Edition) |
| 2019 | ISO 22301 (2nd Edition) |

== See also ==
- Business continuity management system
