= List of ISO standards =

This is a list of published (Note: This list generally excludes draft versions.) standards and other deliverables of the International Organization for Standardization (ISO). (Note: ISO deliverables include "specifications" (ISO/PAS, ISO/TS), "reports" (ISO/TR), etc, which are not referred to by ISO as "standards".) For a complete and up-to-date list of all the ISO standards, see the ISO catalogue.

The standards are protected by copyright and most of them must be purchased. However, about 300 of the standards produced by ISO and IEC's Joint Technical Committee 1 (JTC 1) have been made freely and publicly available.

== ISO 1 – ISO 19999 ==
- ISO 1 – ISO 1999
- ISO 2000 – ISO 2999
- ISO 3000 – ISO 4999
- ISO 5000 – ISO 7999
- ISO 8000 – ISO 9999
- ISO 10000 – ISO 11999
- ISO 12000 – ISO 13999
- ISO 14000 – ISO 15999
- ISO 16000 – ISO 17999
- ISO 18000 – ISO 19999

== ISO 20000 – ISO 99999 ==
- ISO 20000 – ISO 21999
- ISO 22000 – ISO 23999
- ISO 24000 – ISO 25999
- ISO 26000 – ISO 27999
- ISO 28000 – ISO 29999
- ISO 30000 – ISO 99999

== See also ==
- International Classification for Standards
- List of DIN standards
- List of EN standards
- List of IEC standards
- List of ISO technical committees
