= List of ISO standards 14000–15999 =

This is a list of published (Note: This list generally excludes draft versions.) International Organization for Standardization (ISO) standards and other deliverables. (Note: ISO deliverables include "specifications" (ISO/PAS, ISO/TS), "reports" (ISO/TR), etc, which are not referred to by ISO as "standards".) For a complete and up-to-date list of all the ISO standards, see the ISO catalogue.

The standards are protected by copyright and most of them must be purchased. However, about 300 of the standards produced by ISO and IEC's Joint Technical Committee 1 (JTC 1) have been made freely and publicly available.

== ISO 14000 – ISO 14999 ==
- ISO 14000 Environmental management systems (This is a set of standards, rather than a single standard)
- ISO 14001:2015 Environmental management systems – Requirements with guidance for use
- ISO 14004:2016 Environmental management systems – General guidelines on implementation
- ISO 14005:2010 Environmental management systems – Guidelines for the phased implementation of an environmental management system, including the use of environmental performance evaluation
- ISO 14006:2011 Environmental management systems – Guidelines for incorporating ecodesign
- ISO 14015:2022 Environmental management — Guidelines for environmental due diligence assessment
- ISO 14020:2000 Environmental labels and declarations – General principles
- ISO 14031 Environmental management - Environmental performance evaluation – Guidelines
- ISO 14045:2012 describes the principles, requirements and guidelines for eco-efficiency assessment for product systems
- ISO 14046:2014 - Environmental management — Water footprint — Principles, requirements and guidelines
- ISO 14050:2009 Environmental management – Vocabulary
- ISO 14051 Environmental management – Material flow cost accounting - General framework
- ISO 14064 Greenhouse gases
- ISO/TR 14073:2017 Environmental management - Water footprint - Illustrative examples on how to apply ISO 14046
- ISO 14084 Process diagrams for power plants
  - ISO 14084-1:2015 Part 1: Specification for diagrams
  - ISO 14084-2:2015 Part 2: Graphical symbols
- ISO/TS 14101:2012 Surface characterization of gold nanoparticles for nanomaterial specific toxicity screening: FT-IR method
- ISO/IEC 14102:2008 Information technology - Guideline for the evaluation and selection of CASE tools
- ISO/TR 14105:2011 Document management - Change management for successful electronic document management system (EDMS) implementation
- ISO 14117:2012 Active implantable medical devices – Electromagnetic compatibility – EMC test protocols for implantable cardiac pacemakers, implantable cardioverter defibrillators and cardiac resynchronization devices
- ISO 14132 Optics and photonics - Vocabulary for telescopic systems
  - ISO 14132-1:2015 Part 1: General terms and alphabetical indexes of terms in ISO 14132
  - ISO 14132-2:2015 Part 2: Terms for binoculars, monoculars and spotting scopes
  - ISO 14132-3:2014 Part 3: Terms for telescopic sights
  - ISO 14132-4:2015 Part 4: Terms for astronomical telescopes
  - ISO 14132-5:2008 Part 5: Terms for night vision devices
- ISO/IEC 14136:1995 Information technology – Telecommunications and information exchange between systems – Private Integrated Services Network – Specification, functional model and information flows – Identification supplementary services
- ISO 14139:2000 Hydrometric determinations – Flow measurements in open channels using structures – Compound gauging structures
- ISO/IEC 14143 Information technology - Software measurement - Functional size measurement
  - ISO/IEC 14143-1:2007 Part 1: Definition of concepts
  - ISO/IEC 14143-2:2011 Part 2: Conformity evaluation of software size measurement methods to ISO/IEC 14143-1
  - ISO/IEC TR 14143-3:2003 Part 3: Verification of functional size measurement methods
  - ISO/IEC TR 14143-4:2002 Part 4: Reference model
  - ISO/IEC TR 14143-5:2004 Part 5: Determination of functional domains for use with functional size measurement
  - ISO/IEC 14143-6:2012 Part 6: Guide for use of ISO/IEC 14143 series and related International Standards
- ISO 14145 Roller ball pens and refills
  - ISO 14145-2:1998 Part 2: Documentary use (DOC)
- ISO 14155:2011 Clinical investigation of medical devices for human subjects – Good clinical practice
- ISO 14163:1998 Acoustics – Guidelines for noise control by silencers
- ISO 14164:1999 Stationary source emissions – Determination of the volume flowrate of gas streams in ducts – Automated method
- ISO/IEC 14165 Information technology - Fibre Channel
  - ISO/IEC 14165-114:2005 Part 114: 100 MB/s Balanced copper physical interface (FC-100-DF-EL-S)
  - ISO/IEC 14165-115:2006 Part 115: Physical Interfaces (FC-PI)
  - ISO/IEC 14165-116:2005 Part 116: 10 Gigabit (10GFC)
  - ISO/IEC TR 14165-117:2007 Part 117: Methodologies for jitter and signal quality (MJSQ)
  - ISO/IEC 14165-122:2005 Part 122: Arbitrated Loop-2 (FC-AL-2)
  - ISO/IEC 14165-131:2000 Part 131: Switch Fabric Requirements (FC-SW)
  - ISO/IEC 14165-133:2010 Part 133: Switch Fabric-3 (FC-SW-3)
  - ISO/IEC 14165-141:2001 Part 141: Fabric Generic Requirements (FC-FG)
  - ISO/IEC 14165-211:1999 Part 211: Mapping to HIPPI-FP (FC-FP)
  - ISO/IEC 14165-222:2005 Part 222: Single-byte command code 2 mapping protocol (FC-SB-2)
  - ISO/IEC 14165-241:2005 Part 241: Backbone 2 (FC-BB-2)
  - ISO/IEC 14165-243:2012 Part 243: Backbone 3 (FC-BB-3)
  - ISO/IEC 14165-251:2008 Part 251: Framing and Signaling (FC-FS)
  - ISO/IEC TR 14165-312:2009 Part 312: Avionics environment upper layer protocol MIL-STD-1553B Notice 2 (FC-AE-1553)
  - ISO/IEC TR 14165-313:2013 Part 313: Avionics Environment—Anonymous Synchronous Messaging (FC-AE-ASM)
  - ISO/IEC TR 14165-314:2013 Part 314: Avionics Environment – Remote Direct Memory Access (FC-AE-RDMA)
  - ISO/IEC 14165-321:2009 Part 321: Audio-Video (FC-AV)
  - ISO/IEC 14165-331:2007 Part 331: Virtual Interface (FC-VI)
  - ISO/IEC TR 14165-372:2011 Part 372: Methodologies of interconnects-2 (FC-MI-2)
  - ISO/IEC 14165-414:2007 Part 414: Generic Services—4 (FC-GS-4)
  - ISO/IEC 14165-521:2009 Part 521: Fabric application interface standard (FAIS)
- ISO/IEC 14169:1995 Information technology – 90 mm flexible disk cartridges – 21 MB formatted capacity – ISO Type 305
- ISO 14189:2013 Water quality – Enumeration of Clostridium perfringens – Method using membrane filtration
- ISO 14199:2015 Health informatics – Information models – Biomedical Research Integrated Domain Group (BRIDG) Model
- ISO 14223 Radiofrequency identification of animals – Advanced transponders
- ISO 14224 Petroleum, petrochemical and natural gas industries - Collection and exchange of reliability and maintenance data for equipment
- ISO 14230 Road vehicles – Diagnostic systems – Keyword Protocol 2000
- ISO 14242 Implants for surgery – Wear of total hip-joint prostheses
  - ISO 14242-1:2014 Part 1: Loading and displacement parameters for wear-testing machines and corresponding environmental conditions for test
  - ISO 14242-2:2016 Part 2: Methods of measurement
  - ISO 14242-3:2009 Part 3: Loading and displacement parameters for orbital bearing type wear testing machines and corresponding environmental conditions for test
- ISO 14243 Implants for surgery – Wear of total knee-joint prostheses
  - ISO 14243-1:2009 Part 1: Loading and displacement parameters for wear-testing machines with load control and corresponding environmental conditions for test
  - ISO 14243-2:2016 Part 2: Methods of measurement
  - ISO 14243-3:2014 Part 3: Loading and displacement parameters for wear-testing machines with displacement control and corresponding environmental conditions for test
- ISO/IEC 14251:1995 Information technology – Data interchange on 12.7 mm 36-track magnetic tape cartridges
- ISO/IEC TR 14252:1996 Information technology - Guide to the POSIX Open System Environment (OSE) [Withdrawn without replacement]
- ISO 14253 Geometrical product specifications (GPS) - Inspection by measurement of workpieces and measuring equipment
  - ISO 14253-1:2013 Part 1: Decision rules for proving conformity or nonconformity with specifications
  - ISO 14253-2:2011 Part 2: Guidance for the estimation of uncertainty in GPS measurement, in calibration of measuring equipment and in product verification
  - ISO 14253-3:2011 Part 3: Guidelines for achieving agreements on measurement uncertainty statements
  - ISO/TS 14253-4:2010 Part 4: Background on functional limits and specification limits in decision rules
  - ISO 14253-5:2015 Part 5: Uncertainty in verification testing of indicating measuring instruments
  - ISO/TR 14253-6:2012 Part 6: Generalized decision rules for the acceptance and rejection of instruments and workpieces
- ISO/TS 14265:2011 Health Informatics – Classification of purposes for processing personal health information
- ISO/TR 14283:2004 Implants for surgery – Fundamental principles
- ISO 14289 Document management applications - Electronic document file format enhancement for accessibility
  - ISO 14289-1:2014 Part 1: Use of ISO 32000-1 (PDF/UA-1)
- ISO/TR 14292:2012 Health informatics – Personal health records – Definition, scope and context
- ISO 14296:2016 Intelligent transport systems – Extension of map database specifications for applications of cooperative ITS
- ISO 14302:2002 Space systems – Electromagnetic compatibility requirements
- ISO/IEC 14360:1996 Information technology - Open Systems Interconnection (OSI) abstract data manipulation - Application Program Interface (API) [Language independent]
- ISO/IEC 14361:1996 Information technology - MHS-based electronic messaging — Application Programming Interface (API) [Language independent]
- ISO 14362 Textiles - Methods for determination of certain aromatic amines derived from azo colorants
  - ISO 14362-1:2017 Part 1: Detection of the use of certain azo colorants accessible with and without extracting the fibres
  - ISO 14362-3:2017 Part 3: Detection of the use of certain azo colorants, which may release 4-aminoazobenzene
- ISO/IEC 14362:1996 Information technology - Test methods for measuring conformance to Open Systems Interconnection (OSI) abstract data manipulation - Application Program Interface (API) [Language independent]
- ISO/IEC 14363:1996 Information technology — Test methods for measuring conformance to MHS-based electronic messaging — Application Program Interface (API) [Language independent]
- ISO/IEC 14364:1996 Information technology — Open Systems Interconnection (OSI) abstract data manipulation C language interfaces — Binding for Application Program Interface (API)
- ISO/IEC 14365:1996 Information technology — MHS-based electronic messaging C language interfaces — Binding for Application Program Interface (API)
- ISO/IEC 14366:1996 Information technology — Test methods for measuring conformance to Open Systems Interconnection (OSI) abstract data manipulation C language interfaces — Binding for Application Program Interface (API)
- ISO/IEC 14367:1996 Information technology — Test methods for measuring conformance to MHS-based electronic messaging C language interfaces — Binding for Application Program Interface (API)
- ISO/IEC TR 14369:2018 Information technology – Programming languages, their environments and system software interfaces – Guidelines for the preparation of language-independent service specifications (LISS)
- ISO/IEC 14392:1996 Information technology — Directory services — Application Program Interface (API) [Language independent]
- ISO/IEC 14393:1996 Information technology — Test methods for measuring conformance to directory services — Application Program Interface (API) [Language independent]
- ISO/IEC 14394:1996 Information technology — Directory services C language interfaces — Binding for Application Program Interface (API)
- ISO/IEC 14395:1996 Information technology — Test methods for measuring conformance to directory services C language interfaces — Binding for Application Program Interface (API)
- ISO 14396:2002 Reciprocating internal combustion engines — Determination and method for the measurement of engine power — Additional requirements for exhaust emission tests in accordance with ISO 8178
- ISO 14397 Earth-moving machinery — Loaders and backhoe loaders
  - ISO 14397-1:2007 Part 1: Calculation of rated operating capacity and test method for verifying calculated tipping load
  - ISO 14397-2:2007 Part 2: Test method for measuring breakout forces and lift capacity to maximum lift height
- ISO 14405 Geometrical product specifications (GPS) – Dimensional tolerancing
  - ISO 14405-1:2016 Part 1: Linear sizes
  - ISO 14405-2:2011 Part 2: Dimensions other than linear sizes
  - ISO 14405-3:2016 Part 3: Angular sizes
- ISO 14406:2010 Geometrical product specifications (GPS) - Extraction
- ISO 14408:2016 Tracheal tubes designed for laser surgery – Requirements for marking and accompanying information
- ISO 14416:2003 Information and documentation – Requirements for binding of books, periodicals, serials and other paper documents for archive and library use – Methods and materials
- ISO/IEC 14417:1999 Information technology – Data recording format DD-1 for magnetic tape cassette conforming to IEC 1016
- ISO/TS 14441:2013 Health informatics – Security and privacy requirements of EHR systems for use in conformity assessment
- ISO/IEC 14443 Identification cards – Contactless integrated circuit cards – Proximity cards
- ISO 14451 Pyrotechnic articles – Pyrotechnic articles for vehicles
  - ISO 14451-1:2013 Part 1: Terminology
- ISO 14452:2012 Network services billing – Requirements
- ISO 14461 Milk and milk products – Quality control in microbiological laboratories
  - ISO 14461-1:2005 Part 1: Analyst performance assessment for colony counts
  - ISO 14461-2:2005 Part 2: Determination of the reliability of colony counts of parallel plates and subsequent dilution steps
- ISO/IEC 14462:2010 Information technology - Open-edi reference model
- ISO/TR 14468:2010 Selected illustrations of attribute agreement analysis
- ISO/IEC TR 14471:2007 Information technology - Software engineering - Guidelines for the adoption of CASE tools
- ISO/IEC 14473:1999 Information technology - Office equipment - Minimum information to be specified for image scanners
- ISO/IEC 14474:1998 Information technology – Telecommunications and information exchange between systems – Private Integrated Services Network – Functional requirements for static circuit-mode inter-PINX connections
- ISO/IEC TR 14475:2001 Information technology – Telecommunications and information exchange between systems – Private Integrated Services Network – Architecture and scenarios for Private Integrated Services Networking
- ISO/IEC 14476 Information technology – Enhanced communications transport protocol
  - ISO/IEC 14476-1:2002 Specification of simplex multicast transport
  - ISO/IEC 14476-2:2003 Specification of QoS management for simplex multicast transport
  - ISO/IEC 14476-3:2008 Specification of duplex multicast transport
  - ISO/IEC 14476-4:2010 Specification of QoS management for duplex multicast transport
  - ISO/IEC 14476-5:2008 Specification of N-plex multicast transport
  - ISO/IEC 14476-6:2010 Specification of QoS management for n-plex multicast transport
- ISO/IEC 14478 Information technology - Computer graphics and image processing - Presentation Environment for Multimedia Objects (PREMO)
  - ISO/IEC 14478-1:1998 Part 1: Fundamentals of PREMO
  - ISO/IEC 14478-2:1998 Part 2: Foundation Component
  - ISO/IEC 14478-3:1998 Part 3: Multimedia Systems Services
  - ISO/IEC 14478-4:1998 Part 4: Modelling, rendering and interaction component
- ISO/IEC 14492:2001 Information technology - Lossy/lossless coding of bi-level images
- ISO/IEC 14495 Information technology - Lossless and near-lossless compression of continuous-tone still images
  - ISO/IEC 14495-1:1999 Baseline
  - ISO/IEC 14495-2:2003 Extensions
- ISO/IEC 14496 Information technology – Coding of audio-visual objects
- ISO 14500:2003 Textile machinery and accessories – Harnesses for Jacquard weaving machines – Vocabulary
- ISO 14509 Small craft – Airborne sound emitted by powered recreational craft
  - ISO 14509-1:2008 Part 1: Pass-by measurement procedures
  - ISO 14509-3:2009 Part 3: Sound assessment using calculation and measurement procedures
- ISO 14511:2001 Measurement of fluid flow in closed conduits – Thermal mass flowmeters
- ISO/IEC 14515 Information technology - Portable Operating System Interface (POSIX) - Test methods for measuring conformance to POSIX
  - ISO/IEC 14515-1:2000 Part 1: System interfaces
- ISO/IEC TR 14516:2002 Information technology - Security techniques - Guidelines for the use and management of Trusted Third Party services
- ISO/IEC 14517:1996 Information technology - 130 mm optical disk cartridges for information interchange - Capacity: 2.6 GB per cartridge
- ISO/IEC 14519:2001 Information technology - POSIX Ada Language Interfaces - Binding for System Application Program Interface (API)
- ISO 14532:2014 Natural gas – Vocabulary
- ISO 14533 Processes, data elements and documents in commerce, industry and administration – Long term signature profiles
  - ISO 14533-1:2014 Part 1: Long term signature profiles for CMS Advanced Electronic Signatures (CAdES)
  - ISO 14533-2:2012 Part 2: Long term signature profiles for XML Advanced Electronic Signatures (XAdES)
  - ISO 14533-3:2017 Part 3: Long term signature profiles for PDF Advanced Electronic Signatures (PAdES)
- ISO 14534:2011 Ophthalmic optics – Contact lenses and contact lens care products – Fundamental requirements
- ISO 14539:2000 Manipulating industrial robots - Object handling with grasp-type grippers - Vocabulary and presentation of characteristics
- ISO/IEC 14543 Information technology – Home Electronic System (HES) architecture
  - ISO/IEC 14543-2-1:2006 Part 2-1: Introduction and device modularity
  - ISO/IEC 14543-3-1:2006 Part 3-1: Communication layers – Application layer for network based control of HES Class 1
  - ISO/IEC 14543-3-2:2006 Part 3-2: Communication layers – Transport, network and general parts of data link layer for network based control of HES Class 1
  - ISO/IEC 14543-3-3:2007 Part 3-3: User process for network based control of HES Class 1
  - ISO/IEC 14543-3-4:2007 Part 3-4: System management – Management procedures for network based control of HES Class 1
  - ISO/IEC 14543-3-5:2007 Part 3-5: Media and media dependent layers – Power line for network based control of HES Class 1
  - ISO/IEC 14543-3-6:2007 Part 3-6: Media and media dependent layers – Network based on HES Class 1, twisted pair
  - ISO/IEC 14543-3-7:2007 Part 3-7: Media and media dependent layers – Radio frequency for network based control of HES Class 1
  - ISO/IEC 14543-3-10:2012 Part 3-10: Wireless short-packet (WSP) protocol optimized for energy harvesting – Architecture and lower layer protocols
  - ISO/IEC 14543-3-11:2016 Part 3-11: Frequency modulated wireless short-packet (FMWSP) protocol optimised for energy harvesting – Architecture and lower layer protocols
  - ISO/IEC TR 14543-4:2002 Part 4: Home and building automation in a mixed-use building
  - ISO/IEC 14543-4-1:2008 Part 4-1: Communication layers – Application layer for network enhanced control devices of HES Class 1
  - ISO/IEC 14543-4-2:2008 Part 4-2: Communication layers – Transport, network and general parts of data link layer for network enhanced control devices of HES Class 1
  - ISO/IEC 14543-4-3:2015 Part 4-3: Application layer interface to lower communications layers for network enhanced control devices of HES Class 1
  - ISO/IEC 14543-5-1:2010 Part 5-1: Intelligent grouping and resource sharing for Class 2 and Class 3 – Core protocol
  - ISO/IEC 14543-5-3:2012 Part 5-3: Intelligent grouping and resource sharing for HES Class 2 and Class 3 – Basic application
  - ISO/IEC 14543-5-4:2010 Part 5-4: Intelligent grouping and resource sharing for HES Class 2 and Class 3 – Device validation
  - ISO/IEC 14543-5-5:2012 Part 5-5: Intelligent grouping and resource sharing for HES Class 2 and Class 3 – Device type
  - ISO/IEC 14543-5-6:2012 Part 5-6: Intelligent grouping and resource sharing for HES Class 2 and Class 3 – Service type
  - ISO/IEC 14543-5-7:2015 Part 5-7: Intelligent grouping and 3 resource sharing – Remote access system architecture
  - ISO/IEC 14543-5-8:2017 Part 5-8: Intelligent grouping and resource sharing for HES Class 2 and Class 3 – Remote access core protocol
  - ISO/IEC 14543-5-9:2017 Part 5-9: Intelligent grouping and resource sharing for HES class 2 and class 3 – Remote access service platform
  - ISO/IEC 14543-5-21:2012 Part 5-21: Intelligent grouping and resource sharing for HES Class 2 and Class 3 – Application profile – AV profile
  - ISO/IEC 14543-5-22:2010 Part 5-22: Intelligent grouping and resource sharing for HES Class 2 and Class 3 – Application profile – File profile
- ISO 14560:2004 Acceptance sampling procedures by attributes - Specified quality levels in nonconforming items per million
- ISO/TR 14564:1995 Shipbuilding and marine structures - Marking of escape routes
- ISO/IEC 14568:1997 Information technology - DXL: Diagram eXchange Language for tree-structured charts
- ISO/IEC 14575:2000 Information technology - Microprocessor systems - Heterogeneous InterConnect (HIC) (Low-Cost, Low-Latency Scalable Serial Interconnect for Parallel System Construction)
- ISO/IEC 14576:1999 Information technology - Synchronous Split Transfer Type System Bus (STbus) - Logical Layer
- ISO 14580:2011 Hexalobular socket cheese head screws
- ISO 14588:2000 Blind rivets - Terminology and definitions
- ISO/IEC 14598 Software engineering - Product evaluation (Note: The exact wording of this title varies between parts. This is the wording of the most recently published part.)
  - ISO/IEC 14598-5:1998 Part 5: Process for evaluators
  - ISO/IEC 14598-6:2001 Part 6: Documentation of evaluation modules
- ISO 14602:2010 Non-active surgical implants – Implants for osteosynthesis – Particular requirements
- ISO 14607:2007 Non-active surgical implants – Mammary implants – Particular requirements
- ISO 14617 Graphical symbols for diagrams
  - ISO 14617-1:2005 Part 1: General information and indexes
  - ISO 14617-2:2002 Part 2: Symbols having general application
  - ISO 14617-3:2002 Part 3: Connections and related devices
  - ISO 14617-3:2002 Part 3: Connections and related devices
  - ISO 14617-4:2002 Part 4: Actuators and related devices
  - ISO 14617-5:2002 Part 5: Measurement and control devices
  - ISO 14617-6:2002 Part 6: Measurement and control functions
  - ISO 14617-7:2002 Part 7: Basic mechanical components
  - ISO 14617-8:2002 Part 8: Valves and dampers
  - ISO 14617-9:2002 Part 9: Pumps, compressors and fans
  - ISO 14617-10:2002 Part 10: Fluid power converters
  - ISO 14617-11:2002 Part 11: Devices for heat transfer and heat engines
  - ISO 14617-12:2002 Part 12: Devices for separating, purification and mixing
  - ISO 14617-13:2004 Part 13: Devices for material processing
  - ISO 14617-14:2004 Part 14: Devices for transport and handling of material
  - ISO 14617-15:2002 Part 15: Installation diagrams and network maps
- ISO 14630:2012 Non-active surgical implants – General requirements
- ISO 14638:2015 Geometrical product specifications (GPS) - Matrix model
- ISO/TR 14639 Health informatics – Capacity-based eHealth architecture roadmap
  - ISO/TR 14639-1:2012 Part 1: Overview of national eHealth initiatives
  - ISO/TR 14639-2:2014 Part 2: Architectural components and maturity model
- ISO 14641 Electronic archiving
  - ISO 14641-1:2012 Specifications concerning the design and the operation of an information system for electronic information preservation
- ISO 14644 Cleanrooms and associated controlled environments
- ISO/IEC 14651:2020 Information technology — International string ordering and comparison — Method for comparing character strings and description of the common template tailorable ordering
- ISO/IEC 14662:2010 Information technology – Open-edi reference model
- ISO/TR 14685:2001 Hydrometric determinations – Geophysical logging of boreholes for hydrogeological purposes – Considerations and guidelines for making measurements
- ISO 14686:2003 Hydrometric determinations – Pumping tests for water wells – Considerations and guidelines for design, performance and use
- ISO 14695:2003 Industrial fans – Method of measurement of fan vibration
- ISO 14698 Cleanrooms and associated controlled environments – Biocontamination control
  - ISO 14698-1:2003 General principles and methods
  - ISO 14698-2:2003 Evaluation and interpretation of biocontamination data
- ISO/IEC 14699:1997 Information technology – Open Systems Interconnection – Transport Fast Byte Protocol
- ISO/IEC 14700:1997 Information technology – Open Systems Interconnection – Network Fast Byte Protocol
- ISO 14708 Implants for surgery – Active implantable medical devices
  - ISO 14708-1:2014 Part 1: General requirements for safety, marking and for information to be provided by the manufacturer
  - ISO 14708-2:2012 Part 2: Cardiac pacemakers
  - ISO 14708-3:2017 Part 3: Implantable neurostimulators
  - ISO 14708-4:2008 Part 4: Implantable infusion pumps
  - ISO 14708-5:2010 Part 5: Circulatory support devices
  - ISO 14708-6:2010 Part 6: Particular requirements for active implantable medical devices intended to treat tachyarrhythmia (including implantable defibrillators)
  - ISO 14708-7:2013 Part 7: Particular requirements for cochlear implant systems
- ISO/IEC 14709 Information technology - Configuration of Customer Premises Cabling (CPC) for applications
  - ISO/IEC 14709-1:1997 Part 1: Integrated Services Digital Network (ISDN) basic access
  - ISO/IEC 14709-2:1998 Part 2: Integrated Services Digital Network (ISDN) primary rate
- ISO 14722:1998 Moped and moped-rider kinematics – Vocabulary
- ISO 14726:2008 Ships and marine technology – Identification colours for the content of piping systems
- ISO 14729:2001 Ophthalmic optics – Contact lens care products – Microbiological requirements and test methods for products and regimens for hygienic management of contact lenses
- ISO 14730:2014 Ophthalmic optics – Contact lens care products – Antimicrobial preservative efficacy testing and guidance on determining discard date
- ISO 14739 Document management - 3D use of Product Representation Compact (PRC) format
  - ISO 14739-1:2014 Part 1: PRC 10001
- ISO/TR 14742:2010 Financial services – Recommendations on cryptographic algorithms and their use
- ISO/IEC 14750:1999 Information technology – Open Distributed Processing – Interface Definition Language
- ISO/IEC 14752:2000 Information technology - Open Distributed Processing - Protocol support for computational interactions
- ISO/IEC 14753:1999 Information technology - Open Distributed Processing - Interface references and binding
- ISO/IEC 14754:1999 Information technology – Pen-Based Interfaces – Common gestures for Text Editing with Pen-Based Systems
- ISO/IEC 14755:1997 Information technology – Input methods to enter characters from the repertoire of ISO/IEC 10646 with a keyboard or other input device
- ISO/IEC 14756:1999 Information technology - Measurement and rating of performance of computer-based software systems
- ISO/IEC 14760:1997 Information technology - Data interchange on 90 mm overwritable and read only optical disk cartridges using phase change - Capacity: 1.3 GB per cartridge
- ISO/IEC 14762:2009 Information technology - Functional safety requirements for Home and Building Electronic Systems (HBES)
- ISO/IEC 14763 Information technology - Implementation and operation of customer premises cabling
  - ISO/IEC 14763-1:1999 Part 1: Administration
  - ISO/IEC 14763-2:2012 Part 2: Planning and installation
  - ISO/IEC TR 14763-2-1:2011 Part 2-1: Planning and installation - Identifiers within administration systems
  - ISO/IEC 14763-3:2014 Part 3: Testing of optical fibre cabling
- ISO/IEC 14764:2006 Software Engineering - Software Life Cycle Processes - Maintenance
- ISO/IEC 14765:1997 Information technology - Framework for protocol identification and encapsulation
- ISO/IEC 14766:1997 Information technology - Telecommunications and information exchange between systems - Use of OSI applications over the Internet Transmission Control Protocol (TCP)
- ISO/IEC 14769:2001 Information technology - Open Distributed Processing - Type Repository Function
- ISO/IEC 14771:1999 Information technology - Open Distributed Processing - Naming framework
- ISO/IEC 14772 Information technology - Computer graphics and image processing - The Virtual Reality Modeling Language (VRML)
  - ISO/IEC 14772-1:1997 Part 1: Functional specification and UTF-8 encoding
  - ISO/IEC 14772-2:2004 Part 2: External authoring interface (EAI)
- ISO/IEC 14776 Information technology - Small Computer System Interface (SCSI)
  - ISO/IEC 14776-112:2002 Part 112: Parallel Interface-2 (SPI-2)
  - ISO/IEC 14776-113:2002 Part 113: Parallel Interface-3 (SPI-3)
  - ISO/IEC 14776-115:2004 Part 115: Parallel Interface-5 (SPI-5)
  - ISO/IEC 14776-121:2010 Part 121: Passive Interconnect Performance (PIP)
  - ISO/IEC 14776-150:2004 Part 150: Serial Attached SCSI (SAS)
  - ISO/IEC 14776-151:2010 Part 151: Serial Attached SCSI - 1.1 (SAS-1.1)
  - ISO/IEC 14776-153:2015 Part 153: Serial Attached SCSI - 2.1 (SAS-2.1)
  - ISO/IEC 14776-154:2017 Part 154: Serial Attached SCSI – 3 (SAS-3)
  - ISO/IEC 14776-222:2005 Part 222: Fibre Channel Protocol for SCSI, Second Version (FCP-2)
  - ISO/IEC 14776-223:2008 Part 223: Fibre Channel Protocol for SCSI, Third Version (FCP-3)
  - ISO/IEC 14776-232:2001 Part 232: Serial Bus Protocol 2 (SBP-2)
  - ISO/IEC 14776-251:2014 Part 251: USB attached SCSI (UAS)
  - ISO/IEC 14776-261:2012 Part 261: SAS Protocol Layer (SPL)
  - ISO/IEC 14776-262:2017 Part 262: SAS protocol layer - 2 (SPL-2)
  - ISO/IEC 14776-321:2002 Part 321: SCSI-3 Block Commands (SBC)
  - ISO/IEC 14776-322:2007 Part 322: SCSI Block Commands - 2 (SBC-2)
  - ISO/IEC 14776-323:2017 Part 323: SCSI Block commands - 3 (SBC-3)
  - ISO/IEC 14776-326:2015 Part 326: Reduced block commands (RBC)
  - ISO/IEC 14776-331:2002 Part 331: Stream Commands (SSC)
  - ISO/IEC 14776-333:2013 Part 333: SCSI Stream Commands - 3 (SSC-3)
  - ISO/IEC 14776-341:2000 Part 341: Controller Commands (SCC)
  - ISO/IEC 14776-342:2000 Part 342: Controller Commands - 2 (SCC-2)
  - ISO/IEC 14776-351:2007 Part 351: Medium Changer Commands (SCSI-3 SMC)
  - ISO/IEC 14776-362:2006 Part 362: Multimedia commands-2 (MMC-2)
  - ISO/IEC 14776-372:2011 Part 372: SCSI Enclosure Services - 2 (SES-2)
  - ISO/IEC 14776-381:2000 Part 381: Optical Memory Card Device Commands (OMC)
  - ISO/IEC 14776-411:1999 Part 411: SCSI-3 Architecture Model (SCSI-3 SAM)
  - ISO/IEC 14776-412:2006 Part 412: Architecture Model -2 (SAM-2)
  - ISO/IEC 14776-413:2007 Part 413: SCSI Architecture Model -3 (SAM-3)
  - ISO/IEC 14776-414:2009 Part 414: SCSI Architecture Model-4 (SAM-4)
  - ISO/IEC 14776-452:2005 Part 452: SCSI Primary Commands - 2 (SPC-2)
  - ISO/IEC 14776-453:2009 Part 453: Primary commands-3 (SPC-3)
- ISO 14785:2014 Tourist information offices – Tourist information and reception services – Requirements
- ISO/TR 14786:2014 Nanotechnologies – Considerations for the development of chemical nomenclature for selected nano-objects
- ISO 14801 Dentistry – Implants – Dynamic fatigue test for endosseous dental implants
- ISO/TR 14806:2013 Intelligent transport systems – Public transport requirements for the use of payment applications for fare media
- ISO 14813 Intelligent transport systems – Reference model architecture(s) for the ITS sector
  - ISO 14813-1:2015 Part 1: ITS service domains, service groups and services
  - ISO 14813-5:2010 Part 5: Requirements for architecture description in ITS standards
  - ISO 14813-6:2009 Part 6: Data presentation in ASN.1
- ISO 14814:2006 Road transport and traffic telematics – Automatic vehicle and equipment identification – Reference architecture and terminology
- ISO 14815:2005 Road transport and traffic telematics – Automatic vehicle and equipment identification – System specifications
- ISO 14816:2005 Road transport and traffic telematics – Automatic vehicle and equipment identification – Numbering and data structure
- ISO 14817 Intelligent transport systems – ITS central data dictionaries
  - ISO 14817-1:2015 Part 1: Requirements for ITS data definitions
  - ISO 14817-2:2015 Part 2: Governance of the Central ITS Data Concept Registry
  - ISO 14817-3:2017 Part 3: Object identifier assignments for ITS data concepts
- ISO 14819 Intelligent transport systems – Traffic and travel information messages via traffic message coding
  - ISO 14819-1:2013 Part 1: Coding protocol for Radio Data System – Traffic Message Channel (RDS-TMC) using ALERT-C
  - ISO 14819-2:2013 Part 2: Event and information codes for Radio Data System – Traffic Message Channel (RDS-TMC) using ALERT-C
  - ISO 14819-3:2013 Part 3: Location referencing for Radio Data System – Traffic Message Channel (RDS-TMC) using ALERT-C
  - ISO 14819-6:2006 Part 6: Encryption and conditional access for the Radio Data System – Traffic Message Channel ALERT C coding
- ISO 14823:2017 Intelligent transport systems – Graphic data dictionary
- ISO 14825:2011 Intelligent transport systems – Geographic Data Files (GDF) – GDF5.0
- ISO 14827 Transport information and control systems – Data interfaces between centres for transport information and control systems
  - ISO 14827-1:2005 Part 1: Message definition requirements
  - ISO 14827-2:2005 Part 2: DATEX-ASN
- ISO/IEC 14833:1996 Information technology – Data interchange on 12.7 mm 128-Track magnetic tape cartridges – DLT 3 format
- ISO/IEC 14834:1996 Information technology - Distributed Transaction Processing - The XA Specification
- ISO 14837 Mechanical vibration – Ground-borne noise and vibration arising from rail systems
  - ISO 14837-1:2005 Part 1: General guidance
  - ISO/TS 14837-31:2017 Part 31: Guideline on field measurements for the evaluation of human exposure in buildings
  - ISO/TS 14837-32:2015 Part 32: Measurement of dynamic properties of the ground
- ISO 14839 Mechanical vibration - Vibration of rotating machinery equipped with active magnetic bearings
  - ISO 14839-1:2002 Part 1: Vocabulary
  - ISO 14839-2:2004 Part 2: Evaluation of vibration
  - ISO 14839-3:2006 Part 3: Evaluation of stability margin
  - ISO 14839-4:2012 Part 4: Technical guidelines
- ISO/IEC 14840:1996 Information technology – 12.65 mm wide magnetic tape cartridge for information interchange – Helical scan recording – Data-D3-1 format
- ISO/IEC 14841:1996 Information technology – Telecommunications and information exchange between systems – Private Integrated Services Network – Specification, functional model and information flows – Call offer supplementary service
- ISO/IEC 14842:1996 Information technology – Telecommunications and information exchange between systems – Private Integrated Services Network – Specification, functional model and information flows – Do not disturb and do not disturb override supplementary services
- ISO/IEC 14843:2003 Information technology – Telecommunications and information exchange between systems – Private Integrated Services Network – Inter-exchange signalling protocol – Call Offer supplementary service
- ISO/IEC 14844:2003 Information technology – Telecommunications and information exchange between systems – Private Integrated Services Network – Inter-exchange signalling protocol – Do Not Disturb and Do Not Disturb Override supplementary services
- ISO/IEC 14845:1996 Information technology – Telecommunications and information exchange between systems – Private Integrated Services Network – Specification, functional model and information flows – Call intrusion supplementary service
- ISO/IEC 14846:2003 Information technology – Telecommunications and information exchange between systems – Private Integrated Services Network – Inter-exchange signalling protocol – Call Intrusion supplementary service
- ISO 14855 Determination of the ultimate aerobic biodegradability of plastic materials under controlled composting conditions – Method by analysis of evolved carbon dioxide
  - ISO 14855-1:2012 General method
  - ISO 14855-2:2007 Gravimetric measurement of carbon dioxide evolved in a laboratory-scale test
- ISO/IEC 14863:1996 Information technology - System-Independent Data Format (SIDF)
- ISO/TR 14873:2013 Information and documentation - Statistics and quality issues for web archiving
- ISO 14879 Implants for surgery – Total knee-joint prostheses
  - ISO 14879-1:2000 Part 1: Determination of endurance properties of knee tibial trays
- ISO 14880 Optics and photonics - Microlens arrays
  - ISO 14880-1:2016 Part 1: Vocabulary and general properties
  - ISO 14880-2:2006 Part 2: Test methods for wavefront aberrations
  - ISO 14880-3:2006 Part 3: Test methods for optical properties other than wavefront aberrations
  - ISO 14880-4:2006 Part 4: Test methods for geometrical properties
  - ISO/TR 14880-5:2010 Part 5: Guidance on testing
- ISO 14881:2001 Integrated optics – Interfaces – Parameters relevant to coupling properties
- ISO/IEC 14882:2024 Programming languages — C++
- ISO/IEC 14888 Information technology - Security techniques - Digital signatures with appendix
  - ISO/IEC 14888-1:2008 Part 1: General
  - ISO/IEC 14888-2:2008 Part 2: Integer factorization based mechanisms
  - ISO/IEC 14888-3:2016 Part 3: Discrete logarithm based mechanisms
- ISO 14889:2013 Ophthalmic optics – Spectacle lenses – Fundamental requirements for uncut finished lenses
- ISO/TS 14904:2002 Road transport and traffic telematics – Electronic fee collection (EFC) – Interface specification for clearing between operators
- ISO 14906:2011 Electronic fee collection – Application interface definition for dedicated short-range communication
- ISO/TS 14907 Electronic fee collection – Test procedures for user and fixed equipment
  - ISO/TS 14907-1:2015 Part 1: Description of test procedures
  - ISO/TS 14907-2:2016 Part 2: Conformance test for the on-board unit application interface
- ISO/IEC 14908 Information technology - Control network protocol
  - ISO/IEC 14908-1:2012 Part 1: Protocol stack
  - ISO/IEC 14908-2:2012 Part 2: Twisted pair communication
  - ISO/IEC 14908-3:2012 Part 3: Power line channel specification
  - ISO/IEC 14908-4:2012 Part 4: IP communication
- ISO 14915 Software ergonomics for multimedia user interfaces
  - ISO 14915-1:2002 Part 1: Design principles and framework
  - ISO 14915-2:2003 Part 2: Multimedia navigation and control
  - ISO 14915-3:2002 Part 3: Media selection and combination
- ISO 14917:2017 Thermal spraying - Terminology, classification
- ISO 14949:2001 Implants for surgery – Two-part addition-cure silicone elastomers
- ISO/IEC 14957:2010 Information technology — Representation of data element values — Notation of the format
- ISO 14963:2003 Mechanical vibration and shock – Guidelines for dynamic tests and investigations on bridges and viaducts
- ISO 14971:2007 Medical devices – Application of risk management to medical devices
- ISO 14972:1998 Sterile obturators for single use with over-needle peripheral intravascular catheters
- ISO 14975:2000 Surface chemical analysis – Information formats
- ISO 14976:1998 Surface chemical analysis – Data transfer format
- ISO/IEC 14977:1996 Information technology – Syntactic metalanguage – Extended BNF
- ISO 14978:2006 Geometrical product specifications (GPS) – General concepts and requirements for GPS measuring equipment
- ISO 14982:1998 Agricultural and forestry machinery – Electromagnetic compatibility – Test methods and acceptance criteria

== ISO 15000 – ISO 15999 ==
- ISO/TS 15000 Electronic business eXtensible Markup Language ebXML
  - ISO 15000-5:2014 Part 5: Core Components Specification (CCS)
- ISO 15001:2010 Anaesthetic and respiratory equipment – Compatibility with oxygen
- ISO 15002:2008 Flow-metering devices for connection to terminal units of medical gas pipeline systems
- ISO 15003:2019 Agricultural engineering — Electrical and electronic equipment — Testing resistance to environmental conditions
- ISO 15004 Ophthalmic instruments – Fundamental requirements and test methods
- ISO 15005:2017 Road vehicles — Ergonomic aspects of transportation and control systems — Dialogue management principles and compliance procedures
  - ISO 15004-1:2006 Part 1: General requirements applicable to all ophthalmic instruments
  - ISO 15004-2:2007 Part 2: Light hazard protection
- ISO 15006:2011 Road vehicles – Ergonomic aspects of transport information and control systems – Specifications for in-vehicle auditory presentation
- ISO 15007:2020 Road vehicles — Measurement and analysis of driver visual behaviour with respect to transport information and control systems
- ISO 15008:2017 Road vehicles — Ergonomic aspects of transport information and control systems — Specifications and test procedures for in-vehicle visual presentation
- ISO 15009:2016 Soil quality — Gas chromatographic determination of the content of volatile aromatic hydrocarbons, naphthalene and volatile halogenated hydrocarbons — Purge-and-trap method with thermal desorption
- ISO 15010:1998 Disposable hanging devices for transfusion and infusion bottles – Requirements and test methods
- ISO 15011 Health and safety in welding and allied processes — Laboratory method for sampling fume and gases
  - ISO 15011-1:2009 Part 1: Determination of fume emission rate during arc welding and collection of fume for analysis
  - ISO 15011-2:2009 Part 2: Determination of the emission rates of carbon monoxide (CO), carbon dioxide (CO_{2}), nitrogen monoxide (NO) and nitrogen dioxide (NO_{2}) during arc welding, cutting and gouging
  - ISO 15011-3:2009 Part 3: Determination of ozone emission rate during arc welding
  - ISO 15011-4:2017 Part 4: Fume data sheets
  - ISO 15011-5:2011 Part 5: Identification of thermal-degradation products generated when welding or cutting through products composed wholly or partly of organic materials using pyrolysis-gas chromatography-mass spectrometry
- ISO 15016:2015 Ships and marine technology - Guidelines for the assessment of speed and power performance by analysis of speed trial data
- ISO/IEC 15018:2004 Information technology - Generic cabling for homes
- ISO 15022 Securities – Scheme for messages (Data Field Dictionary)
- ISO/IEC 15026 Systems and software engineering—Systems and software assurance
  - ISO/IEC 15026-1:2013 Part 1: Concepts and vocabulary
  - ISO/IEC 15026-2:2011 Part 2: Assurance case
  - ISO/IEC 15026-3:2015 Part 3: System integrity levels
  - ISO/IEC 15026-4:2012 Part 4: Assurance in the life cycle
- ISO 15031 Road vehicles – Communication between vehicle and external equipment for emissions-related diagnostics
  - ISO 15031-2:2010 Part 2: Guidance on terms, definitions, abbreviations and acronyms
- ISO 15032:2000 Prostheses – Structural testing of hip units
- ISO/IEC 15041:1997 Information technology - Data interchange on 90 mm optical disk cartridges - Capacity: 640 MB per cartridge
- ISO/IEC TR 15044:2000 Information technology - Terminology for the Home Electronic System (HES)
- ISO/IEC 15045 Information technology - Home Electronic System (HES) gateway
  - ISO/IEC 15045-1:2004 Part 1: A residential gateway model for HES
  - ISO/IEC 15045-2:2012 Part 2: Modularity and protocol
- ISO/IEC 15049:1997 Information technology – Telecommunications and information exchange between systems – Private Integrated Services Network – Specification, functional model and information flows – Advice of charge supplementary services
- ISO/IEC 15050:2003 Information technology – Telecommunications and information exchange between systems – Private Integrated Services Network – Inter-exchange signalling protocol – Advice Of Charge supplementary services
- ISO/IEC 15051:2003 Information technology – Telecommunications and information exchange between systems – Private Integrated Services Network – Specification, functional model and information flows – Recall supplementary service
- ISO/IEC 15052:2003 Information technology – Telecommunications and information exchange between systems – Private Integrated Services Network – Inter-exchange signalling protocol – Recall supplementary service
- ISO/IEC 15053:2003 Information technology – Telecommunications and information exchange between systems – Private Integrated Services Network – Specification, functional model and information flows – Call Interception additional network feature
- ISO/IEC 15054:2003 Information technology – Telecommunications and information exchange between systems – Private Integrated Services Network – Inter-exchange signalling protocol – Call Interception additional network feature
- ISO/IEC 15055:1997 Information technology – Telecommunications and information exchange between systems – Private Integrated Services Network – Specification, functional model and information flows – Transit counter additional network feature
- ISO/IEC 15056:1997 Information technology – Telecommunications and information exchange between systems – Private Integrated Services Network – Inter-exchange signalling protocol – Transit counter additional network feature
- ISO/IEC 15067 Information technology - Home Electronic System (HES) application model (Note: The exact wording of this title varies between parts. This is the wording of the most recently published part.)
  - ISO/IEC TR 15067-2:1997 Part 2: Lighting model for HES
  - ISO/IEC 15067-3:2012 Part 3: Model of a demand-response energy management system for HES
  - ISO/IEC TR 15067-3-2:2016 Part 3-2: GridWise interoperability context-setting framework
  - ISO/IEC TR 15067-4:2001 Part 4: Security System for HES
- ISO 15075:2003 Transport information and control systems – In-vehicle navigation systems – Communications message set requirements
- ISO 15081:2011 Agricultural equipment - Graphical symbols for pressurized irrigation systems
- ISO 15082 Road vehicles – Tests for rigid plastic safety glazing materials
- ISO 15086 Hydraulic fluid power – Determination of the fluid-borne noise characteristics of components and systems
  - ISO 15086-1:2001 Part 1: Introduction
  - ISO 15086-2:2000 Part 2: Measurement of the speed of sound in a fluid in a pipe
  - ISO 15086-3:2008 Part 3: Measurement of hydraulic impedance
- ISO 15099 Thermal performance of windows, doors and shading devices – Detailed calculations
- ISO 15112 Natural gas – Energy determination
- ISO 15118 Road vehicles - Vehicle to grid communication interface
- ISO 15137:2005 Self-adhesive hanging devices for infusion bottles and injection vials – Requirements and test methods
- ISO 15142 Implants for surgery – Metal intramedullary nailing systems
  - ISO 15142-1:2003 Part 1: Intramedullary nails
  - ISO 15142-2:2003 Part 2: Locking components
  - ISO 15142-3:2003 Part 3: Connection devices and reamer diameter measurements
- ISO 15143 Earth-moving machinery and mobile road construction machinery – Worksite data exchange
  - ISO 15143-1:2010 Part 1: System architecture
  - ISO 15143-2:2010 Part 2: Data dictionary
  - ISO/TS 15143-3:2016 Part 3: Telematics data
- ISO/IEC 15145:1997 Information technology - Programming languages - FORTH
- ISO/IEC 15149:2011 Information technology – Telecommunications and information exchange between systems – Magnetic field area network (MFAN)
  - ISO/IEC 15149-1:2014 Part 1: Air interface
  - ISO/IEC 15149-2:2015 Part 2: In-band Control Protocol for Wireless Power Transfer
  - ISO/IEC 15149-3:2016 Part 3: Relay Protocol for Extended Range
  - ISO/IEC 15149-4:2016 Part 4: Security Protocol for Authentication
- ISO 15174:2012 Milk and milk products – Microbial coagulants – Determination of total milk-clotting activity
- ISO 15188:2001 Project management guidelines for terminology standardization
- ISO 15189:2012 Medical laboratories – Particular requirements for quality and competence
- ISO/IEC 15200:1996 Information technology - Adaptive Lossless Data Compression algorithm (ALDC)
- ISO/IEC 15205:2000 SBus - Chip and module interconnect bus
- ISO 15212 Oscillation-type density meters
  - ISO 15212-1:1998 Part 1: Laboratory instruments
  - ISO 15212-2:2002 Part 2: Process instruments for homogeneous liquids
- ISO 15213:2003 Microbiology of food and animal feeding stuffs – Horizontal method for the enumeration of sulfite-reducing bacteria growing under anaerobic conditions
- ISO 15214:1998 Microbiology of food and animal feeding stuffs – Horizontal method for the enumeration of mesophilic lactic acid bacteria – Colony-count technique at 30 degrees C
- ISO 15216 Microbiology of the food chain - Horizontal method for determination of hepatitis A virus and norovirus using real-time RT-PCR
  - ISO 15216-1:2017 Part 1: Method for quantification
  - ISO/TS 15216-2:2013 Part 2: Method for qualitative detection
- ISO 15223 Medical devices – Symbols to be used with medical device labels, labelling, and information to be supplied
  - ISO 15223-1:2016 Part 1: General requirements
  - ISO 15223-2:2010 Part 2: Symbol development, selection and validation
- ISO 15225:2016 Medical devices – Quality management – Medical device nomenclature data structure
- ISO 15226:1999 Technical product documentation – Life cycle model and allocation of documents
- ISO 15230:2007 Mechanical vibration and shock – Coupling forces at the man–machine interface for hand-transmitted vibration
- ISO/TR 15235:2001 Preparation of steel substrates before application of paints and related products - Collected information on the effect of levels of water-soluble salt contamination
- ISO 15241:2012 Rolling bearings - Symbols for physical quantities
- ISO 15253:2000 Ophthalmic optics and instruments – Optical devices for enhancing low vision
- ISO 15254:2009 Ophthalmic optics and instruments – Electro-optical devices for enhancing low vision
- ISO 15261:2004 Vibration and shock generating systems - Vocabulary
- ISO/IEC TR 15285:1998 Information technology - An operational model for characters and glyphs
- ISO/IEC 15286:1999 Information technology - 130 mm optical disk cartridges for information interchange - Capacity: 5.2 GB per cartridge
- ISO/IEC/IEEE 15288:2015 Systems and software engineering – System life cycle processes
- ISO/IEC/IEEE 15289:2017 Systems and software engineering – Content of life-cycle information items (documentation)
- ISO/IEC 15291:1999 Information technology – Programming languages – Ada Semantic Interface Specification (ASIS)
- ISO/IEC TR 15294:2000 Information technology – Methods for data flow control at synchronous and asynchronous DTE-DCE interfaces
- ISO 15296:2004 Gas welding equipment - Vocabulary - Terms used for gas welding equipment
- ISO/TR 15300:2001 Dentistry - Application of OSI clinical codification to the classification and coding of dental products
- ISO/IEC 15307:1997 Information technology – Data interchange on 12.7 mm 128-track magnetic tape cartridges – DLT 4 format
- ISO 15309:2013 Implants for surgery – Differential scanning calorimetry of poly ether ether ketone (PEEK) polymers and compounds for use in implantable medical devices
- ISO/PAS 15339 Graphic technology - Printing from digital data across multiple technologies
  - ISO/PAS 15339-1:2015 Part 1: Principles
  - ISO/PAS 15339-2:2015 Part 2: Characterized reference printing conditions, CRPC1-CRPC7
- ISO 15367 Lasers and laser-related equipment - Test methods for determination of the shape of a laser beam wavefront
  - ISO 15367-1:2003 Part 1: Terminology and fundamental aspects
  - ISO 15367-2:2005 Part 2: Shack-Hartmann sensors
- ISO 15368:2001 Optics and optical instruments - Measurement of reflectance of plane surfaces and transmittance of plane parallel elements
- ISO 15374:1998 Implants for surgery – Requirements for production of forgings
- ISO 15375:2010 Medical infusion bottles – Suspension devices for multiple use – Requirements and test methods
- ISO/TR 15377:2007 Measurement of fluid flow by means of pressure-differential devices – Guidelines for the specification of orifice plates, nozzles and Venturi tubes beyond the scope of ISO 5167
- ISO 15378:2017 Primary packaging materials for medicinal products – Particular requirements for the application of ISO 9001:2015, with reference to good manufacturing practice (GMP)
- ISO 15394:2009 Packaging - Bar code and two-dimensional symbols for shipping, transport and receiving labels
- ISO 15403 Natural gas – Natural gas for use as a compressed fuel for vehicles
  - ISO 15403-1:2006 Part 1: Designation of the quality
  - ISO/TR 15403-2:2006 Part 2: Specification of the quality
- ISO/IEC 15404:2000 Information technology – Office machines – Minimum information to be included in specification sheets – Facsimile equipment
- ISO/IEC 15408 Information technology – Security techniques – Evaluation criteria for IT security
  - ISO/IEC 15408-1:2009 Part 1: Introduction and general model
  - ISO/IEC 15408-2:2008 Part 2: Security functional components
  - ISO/IEC 15408-3:2008 Part 3: Security assurance components
- ISO/IEC TR 15410:1998 Information technology – Telecommunications and information exchange between systems – PISN mobility-general principles and services aspects
- ISO/IEC 15411:1999 Information technology - Segmented keyboard layouts
- ISO/IEC 15412:1999 Information technology - Portable computer keyboard layouts
- ISO/IEC TR 15413:2001 Information technology - Font services - Abstract service definition
- ISO/IEC 15414:2015 Information technology - Open data processing - Reference Model - Enterprise Language
- ISO/IEC 15415:2011 Information technology - Automatic identification and data capture techniques - Bar code symbol print quality test specification - Two-dimensional symbols
- ISO/IEC 15416:2016 Automatic identification and data capture techniques - Bar code print quality test specification - Linear symbols
- ISO/IEC 15417:2007 Information technology - Automatic identification and data capture techniques - Code 128 bar code symbology specification
- ISO/IEC 15418:2016 Information technology - Automatic identification and data capture techniques - GS1 Application Identifiers and ASC MH10 Data Identifiers and maintenance
- ISO/IEC 15419:2009 Information technology - Automatic identification and data capture techniques - Bar code digital imaging and printing performance testing
- ISO/IEC 15420:2009 Information technology - Automatic identification and data capture techniques - EAN/UPC bar code symbology specification
- ISO/IEC 15421:2010 Information technology - Automatic identification and data capture techniques - Bar code master test specifications
- ISO/IEC 15423:2009 Information technology - Automatic identification and data capture techniques - Bar code scanner and decoder performance testing
- ISO/IEC 15424:2008 Information technology - Automatic identification and data capture techniques - Data Carrier Identifiers (including Symbology Identifiers)
- ISO/IEC 15426 Information technology - Automatic identification and data capture techniques - Bar code verifier conformance specification
  - ISO/IEC 15426-1:2006 Part 1: Linear symbols
  - ISO/IEC 15426-2:2015 Part 2: Two-dimensional symbols
- ISO/IEC 15428:1999 Information technology – Telecommunications and information exchange between systems – Private Integrated Services Network – Specification, functional model and information flows – Wireless Terminal Location Registration supplementary service and Wireless Terminal Information Exchange additional network feature
- ISO/IEC 15429:2003 Information technology – Telecommunications and information exchange between systems – Private Integrated Services Network – Inter-exchange signalling protocol – Wireless Terminal Location Registration supplementary service and Wireless Terminal Information exchange additional network feature
- ISO/IEC 15430:1999 Information technology – Telecommunications and information exchange between systems – Private Integrated Services Network – Specification, functional model and information flows – Wireless terminal call handling additional network features
- ISO/IEC 15431:2003 Information technology – Telecommunications and information exchange between systems – Private Integrated Services Network – Inter-exchange signalling protocol – Wireless terminal call handling additional network features
- ISO/IEC 15432:1999 Information technology – Telecommunications and information exchange between systems – Private Integrated Services Network – Specification, functional model and information flows – Wireless Terminal Authentication supplementary services (WTAT and WTAN)
- ISO/IEC 15433:2003 Information technology – Telecommunications and information exchange between systems – Private Integrated Services Network – Inter-exchange signalling protocol – Wireless Terminal Authentication supplementary services
- ISO/IEC 15434:2006 Information technology – Automatic identification and data capture techniques – Syntax for high-capacity ADC media
- ISO/IEC 15437:2001 Information technology - Enhancements to LOTOS (E-LOTOS)
- ISO/IEC 15438:2015 Information technology - Automatic identification and data capture techniques - PDF417 bar code symbology specification
- ISO/IEC TR 15440:2016 Information technology - Future keyboards and other input devices and entry methods
- ISO/IEC TR 15443 Information technology - Security techniques - Security assurance framework
  - ISO/IEC TR 15443-1:2012 Part 1: Introduction and concepts
  - ISO/IEC TR 15443-2:2012 Part 2: Analysis
- ISO/IEC 15444 Information technology – JPEG 2000 image coding system
  - ISO/IEC 15444-1:2016 Core coding system
  - ISO/IEC 15444-2:2004 Extensions
  - ISO/IEC 15444-3:2007 Motion JPEG 2000
  - ISO/IEC 15444-4:2004 Conformance testing
  - ISO/IEC 15444-5:2015 Reference software
  - ISO/IEC 15444-6:2013 Part 6: Compound image file format
  - ISO/IEC 15444-8:2007 Secure JPEG 2000
  - ISO/IEC 15444-9:2005 Interactivity tools, APIs and protocols
  - ISO/IEC 15444-10:2011 Extensions for three-dimensional data
  - ISO/IEC 15444-11:2007 Wireless
  - ISO/IEC 15444-12:2015 Part 12: ISO base media file format [Withdrawn, no replacement]
  - ISO/IEC 15444-13:2008 An entry level JPEG 2000 encoder
  - ISO/IEC 15444-14:2013 Part 14: XML representation and reference
- ISO/IEC 15445:2000 Information technology – Document description and processing languages – HyperText Markup Language (HTML)
- ISO/IEC TR 15446:2009 Information technology - Security techniques - Guide for the production of Protection Profiles and Security Targets
- ISO/IEC 15457 Identification cards – Thin flexible cards
  - ISO/IEC 15457-1:2008 Part 1: Physical characteristics
  - ISO/IEC 15457-2:2007 Part 2: Magnetic recording technique
  - ISO/IEC 15457-3:2008 Part 3: Test methods
- ISO/IEC 15459 Information technology - Automatic identification and data capture techniques - Unique identification
  - ISO/IEC 15459-1:2014 Part 1: Individual transport units
  - ISO/IEC 15459-2:2015 Part 2: Registration procedures
  - ISO/IEC 15459-3:2014 Part 3: Common rules
  - ISO/IEC 15459-4:2014 Part 4: Individual products and product packages
  - ISO/IEC 15459-5:2014 Part 5: Individual returnable transport items (RTIs)
  - ISO/IEC 15459-6:2014 Part 6: Groupings
- ISO 15469:2004 Spatial distribution of daylight – CIE standard general sky
- ISO/IEC 15474 Information technology - CDIF framework
  - ISO/IEC 15474-1:2002 Part 1: Overview
  - ISO/IEC 15474-2:2002 Part 2: Modelling and extensibility
- ISO/IEC 15475 Information technology - CDIF transfer format
  - ISO/IEC 15475-1:2002 Part 1: General rules for syntaxes and encodings
  - ISO/IEC 15475-2:2002 Part 2: Syntax SYNTAX.1
  - ISO/IEC 15475-3:2002 Part 3: Encoding ENCODING.1
- ISO/IEC 15476 Information technology - CDIF semantic metamodel
  - ISO/IEC 15476-1:2002 Part 1: Foundation
  - ISO/IEC 15476-2:2002 Part 2: Common
  - ISO/IEC 15476-3:2006 Part 3: Data definitions
  - ISO/IEC 15476-4:2005 Part 4: Data models
  - ISO/IEC 15476-6:2006 Part 6: State/event models
- ISO 15480:2019 Fasteners — Hexagon washer head drilling screws with tapping screw thread
- ISO 15481:1999 Cross recessed pan head drilling screws with tapping screw thread
- ISO 15482:1999 Cross recessed countersunk head drilling screws with tapping screw thread
- ISO 15483:1999 Cross recessed raised countersunk head drilling screws with tapping screw thread
- ISO/IEC 15485:1997 Information technology - Data interchange on 120 mm optical disk cartridges using phase change PD format - Capacity: 650 MB per cartridge
- ISO/IEC 15486:1998 Information technology - Data interchange on 130 mm optical disk cartridges of type WORM (Write Once Read Many) using irreversible effects - Capacity: 2.6 GB per cartridge
- ISO 15489 Information and documentation – Records management
  - ISO 15489-1:2016 Part 1: Concepts and principles
  - ISO/TR 15489-2:2001 Part 2: Guidelines [Withdrawn, no replacement]
- ISO/IEC 15498:1997 Information technology - Data interchange on 90 mm optical disk cartridges - HS-1 format - Capacity: 650 MB per cartridge
- ISO/IEC 15504 Information technology – Process assessment
- ISO/IEC 15505:2003 Information technology – Telecommunications and information exchange between systems – Private Integrated Services Network – Specification, functional model and information flows – Message Waiting Indication supplementary service
- ISO/IEC 15506:2003 Information technology – Telecommunications and information exchange between systems – Private Integrated Services Network – Inter-exchange signalling protocol – Message Waiting Indication supplementary service
- ISO/IEC 15507:1997 Information technology – Telecommunications and information exchange between systems – Private Integrated Services Network – Inter-exchange signalling protocol – PINX clock synchronization
- ISO 15511:2011 Information and documentation - International standard identifier for libraries and related organizations (ISIL)
- ISO 15519 Specification for diagrams for process industry
  - ISO 15519-1:2010 Part 1: General rules
  - ISO 15519-2:2015 Part 2: Measurement and control
- ISO/IEC 15521:1998 Information technology – 3.81 mm wide magnetic tape cartridge for information interchange – Helical scan recording – DDS-3 format using 125 m length tapes
- ISO 15529:2010 Optics and photonics - Optical transfer function - Principles of measurement of modulation transfer function (MTF) of sampled imaging systems
- ISO 15530 Geometrical product specifications (GPS) – Coordinate measuring machines (CMM): Technique for determining the uncertainty of measurement
  - ISO/TS 15530-1:2013 Part 1: Overview and metrological characteristics
  - ISO 15530-3:2011 Part 3: Use of calibrated workpieces or measurement standards
  - ISO/TS 15530-4:2008 Part 4: Evaluating task-specific measurement uncertainty using simulation
- ISO 15553:2006 Water quality – Isolation and identification of Cryptosporidium oocysts and Giardia cysts from water
- ISO 15583:2005 Ships and marine technology - Maritime standards list
- ISO/TR 15599:2002 Digital codification of dental laboratory procedures
- ISO 15614 Specification and qualification of welding procedures for metallic materials – Welding procedure test
- ISO 15622:2010 Intelligent transport systems – Adaptive Cruise Control systems – Performance requirements and test procedures
- ISO 15623:2013 Intelligent transport systems – Forward vehicle collision warning systems – Performance requirements and test procedures
- ISO/TS 15624:2001 Transport information and control systems – Traffic Impediment Warning Systems (TIWS) – System requirements
- ISO 15628:2013 Intelligent transport systems – Dedicated short range communication (DSRC) – DSRC application layer
- ISO 15638 Intelligent transport systems – Framework for cooperative telematics applications for regulated commercial freight vehicles (TARV)
  - ISO 15638-1:2012 Part 1: Framework and architecture
  - ISO 15638-2:2013 Part 2: Common platform parameters using CALM
  - ISO 15638-3:2013 Part 3: Operating requirements, 'Approval Authority' procedures, and enforcement provisions for the providers of regulated services
  - ISO 15638-5:2013 Part 5: Generic vehicle information
  - ISO 15638-6:2014 Part 6: Regulated applications
  - ISO 15638-7:2013 Part 7: Other applications
  - ISO 15638-8:2014 Part 8: Vehicle access management
  - ISO/TS 15638-9:2013 Part 9: Remote electronic tachograph monitoring (RTM)
  - ISO 15638-10:2017 Part 10: Emergency messaging system/eCall
  - ISO 15638-11:2014 Part 11: Driver work records
  - ISO 15638-12:2014 Part 12: Vehicle mass monitoring
  - ISO/TS 15638-13:2015 Part 13: "Mass" information for jurisdictional control and enforcement
  - ISO 15638-14:2014 Part 14: Vehicle access control
  - ISO 15638-15:2014 Part 15: Vehicle location monitoring
  - ISO 15638-16:2014 Part 16: Vehicle speed monitoring
  - ISO 15638-17:2014 Part 17: Consignment and location monitoring
  - ISO 15638-18:2017 Part 18: ADR (Dangerous Goods)
  - ISO/TS 15638-19:2013 Part 19: Vehicle parking facilities (VPF)
- ISO 15642:2003 Road construction and maintenance equipment – Asphalt mixing plants – Terminology and commercial specifications
- ISO 15662:2006 Intelligent transport systems – Wide area communication – Protocol management information
- ISO 15664:2001 Acoustics – Noise control design procedures for open plant
- ISO 15665:2003 Acoustics – Acoustic insulation for pipes, valves and flanges
- ISO 15667:2000 Acoustics – Guidelines for noise control by enclosures and cabins
- ISO 15674:2016 Cardiovascular implants and artificial organs – Hard-shell cardiotomy/venous reservoir systems (with/without filter) and soft venous reservoir bags
- ISO 15675:2016 Cardiovascular implants and artificial organs – Cardiopulmonary bypass systems – Arterial blood line filters
- ISO 15676:2016 Cardiovascular implants and artificial organs – Requirements for single-use tubing packs for cardiopulmonary bypass and extracorporeal membrane oxygenation (ECMO)
- ISO 15686 Buildings and constructed assets – Service life planning
- ISO 15688:2012 Road construction and maintenance equipment – Soil stabilizers – Terminology and commercial specifications
- ISO 15689:2003 Road construction and maintenance equipment – Powder binder spreaders – Terminology and commercial specifications
- ISO/IEC 15693 Identification cards – Contactless integrated circuit cards – Vicinity cards
- ISO/TS 15696:2012 Cranes – List of equivalent terms
- ISO 15706 Information and documentation – International Standard Audiovisual Number (ISAN)
- ISO 15707:2001 Information and documentation – International Standard Musical Work Code (ISWC)
- ISO/IEC 15718:1998 Information technology – Data interchange on 8 mm wide magnetic tape cartridge – Helical scan recording – HH-1 format
- ISO/IEC 15731:1998 Information technology – 12.65 mm wide magnetic tape cassette for information interchange – Helical scan recording – DTF-1 format
- ISO 15744:2002 Hand-held non-electric power tools – Noise measurement code – Engineering method (grade 2)
- ISO 15747:2010 Plastic containers for intravenous injections
- ISO 15752:2010 Ophthalmic instruments – Endoilluminators – Fundamental requirements and test methods for optical radiation safety
- ISO/IEC 15757:1998 Information technology – Data interchange on 8 mm wide magnetic tape cartridge – Helical scan recording – DA-2 format
- ISO 15759:2005 Medical infusion equipment – Plastics caps with inserted elastomeric liner for containers manufactured by the blow-fill-seal (BFS) process
- ISO/TS 15768:2000 Measurement of liquid velocity in open channels – Design, selection and use of electromagnetic current meters
- ISO 15769:2010 Hydrometry – Guidelines for the application of acoustic velocity meters using the Doppler and echo correlation methods
- ISO/IEC 15771:1998 Information technology – Telecommunications and information exchange between systems – Private Integrated Services Network – Specification, functional model and information flows – Common information additional network feature
- ISO/IEC 15772:2003 Information technology – Telecommunications and information exchange between systems – Private Integrated Services Network – Inter-exchange signalling protocol – Common Information additional network feature
- ISO/IEC 15773:1998 Information technology – Telecommunications and information exchange between systems – Broadband Private Integrated Services Network – Inter-exchange signalling protocol – Transit counter additional network feature
- ISO/IEC 15776:2001 VME64bus - Specification
- ISO/IEC 15780:1998 Information technology – 8 mm wide magnetic tape cartridge – Helical scan recording – AIT-1 format
- ISO 15782 Certificate management for financial services
  - ISO 15782-1:2009 Part 1: Public key certificates
  - ISO 15782-2:2001 Part 2: Certificate extensions
- ISO 15783:2002 Seal-less rotodynamic pumps – Class II – Specification
- ISO 15784 Intelligent transport systems (ITS) – Data exchange involving roadside modules communication
  - ISO 15784-1:2008 Part 1: General principles and documentation framework of application profiles
  - ISO 15784-2:2015 Part 2: Centre to field device communications using SNMP
  - ISO 15784-3:2008 Part 3: Application profile-data exchange (AP-DATEX)
- ISO 15785:2002 Technical drawings – Symbolic presentation and indication of adhesive, fold and pressed joints
- ISO 15786:2008 Technical drawings – Simplified representation and dimensioning of holes
- ISO 15787:2016 Technical product documentation – Heat-treated ferrous parts – Presentation and indications
- ISO 15798:2013 Ophthalmic implants – Ophthalmic viscosurgical devices
- ISO/IEC 15802 Information technology – Telecommunications and information exchange between systems – Local and metropolitan area networks – Common specifications
  - ISO/IEC 15802-1:1995 Part 1: Medium Access Control (MAC) service definition
  - ISO/IEC 15802-3:1998 Part 3: Media Access Control (MAC) Bridges
- ISO/IEC 15816:2002 Information technology - Security techniques - Security information objects for access control
- ISO 15836:2009 Information and documentation – The Dublin Core metadata element set
  - ISO 15836-1:2017 Part 1: Core elements
- ISO/TR 15847:2008 Graphic technology - Graphical symbols for printing press systems and finishing systems, including related auxiliary equipment
- ISO 15849:2001 Ships and marine technology – Guidelines for implementation of a fleet management system network
- ISO/IEC 15851:1999 Information technology - Communication protocol - Open MUMPS Interconnect
- ISO/IEC 15852:1999 Information technology - Programming languages - M Windowing API
- ISO 15867:2003 Intermediate bulk containers (IBCs) for non-dangerous goods – Terminology
- ISO 15870:2000 Powered industrial trucks - Safety signs and hazard pictorials - General principles
- ISO 15878:2008 Road construction and maintenance equipment – Asphalt pavers – Terminology and commercial specifications
- ISO/IEC 15895:1999 Information technology – Data interchange on 12.7 mm 128-track magnetic tape cartridges – DLT 3-XT format
- ISO/IEC 15896:1999 Information technology – Data interchange on 12.7 mm 208-track magnetic tape cartridges – DLT 5 format
- ISO/IEC 15897:2011 Information technology - User interfaces - Procedures for the registration of cultural elements
- ISO 15883-1:2006 specifies general performance requirements for washer-disinfectors (WD) and their accessories that are intended to be used for cleaning and disinfection of re-usable medical devices and other articles used in the context of medical, dental, pharmaceutical and veterinary practice.
- ISO/IEC 15898:1998 Information technology - Data interchange on 356 mm optical disk cartridges - WORM, using phase change technology - Capacity: 14.8 GB and 25 GB per cartridge
- ISO/IEC 15899:1998 Information technology – Telecommunications and information exchange between systems – Broadband Private Integrated Services Network – Service description – Broadband connection oriented bearer services
- ISO 15901-2:2022 Pore size distribution and porosity of solid materials by mercury porosimetry and gas adsorption — Part 2: Analysis of nanopores by gas adsorption
- ISO 15902:2004 Optics and photonics - Diffractive optics - Vocabulary
- ISO/IEC 15909 Systems and software engineering - High-level Petri nets
  - ISO/IEC 15909-1:2004 Part 1: Concepts, definitions and graphical notation
  - ISO/IEC 15909-2:2011 Part 2: Transfer format
- ISO 15919:2001 Information and documentation - Transliteration of Devanagari and related Indic scripts into Latin characters
- ISO 15924:2004 Information and documentation – Codes for the representation of names of scripts
- ISO 15926 - Integration of Life-cycle Data for Process Plants including Oil and Gas Production Facilities
- ISO 15927 Hygrothermal performance of buildings – Calculation and presentation of climatic data
  - ISO 15927-1:2003 Part 1: Monthly means of single meteorological elements
  - ISO 15927-2:2009 Part 2: Hourly data for design cooling load
  - ISO 15927-3:2009 Part 3: Calculation of a driving rain index for vertical surfaces from hourly wind and rain data
  - ISO 15927-4:2005 Part 4: Hourly data for assessing the annual energy use for heating and cooling
  - ISO 15927-5:2004 Part 5: Data for design heat load for space heating
  - ISO 15927-6:2007 Part 6: Accumulated temperature differences (degree-days)
- ISO 15930 Graphic technology – Prepress digital data exchange using PDF
- ISO 15932:2013 Microbeam analysis - Analytical electron microscopy - Vocabulary
- ISO/IEC 15938 Information technology - Multimedia content description interface
- ISO/IEC/IEEE 15939:2017 Systems and software engineering - Measurement process
- ISO/IEC 15940:2013 Systems and software engineering - Software Engineering Environment Services
- ISO/IEC TR 15942:2000 Information technology - Programming languages - Guide for the use of the Ada programming language in high integrity systems
- ISO/IEC 15944 Information technology - Business operational view
  - ISO/IEC 15944-1:2011 Part 1: Operational aspects of open-edi for implementation
  - ISO/IEC 15944-2:2015 Part 2: Registration of scenarios and their components as business objects
  - ISO/IEC 15944-4:2015 Part 4: Business transaction scenarios – Accounting and economic ontology
  - ISO/IEC 15944-5:2008 Part 5: Identification and referencing of requirements of jurisdictional domains as sources of external constraints
  - ISO/IEC TR 15944-6:2015 Part 6: Technical introduction to e-Business modelling
  - ISO/IEC 15944-7:2009 Part 7: eBusiness vocabulary
  - ISO/IEC 15944-8:2012 Part 8: Identification of privacy protection requirements as external constraints on business transactions
  - ISO/IEC 15944-9:2015 Part 9: Business transaction traceability framework for commitment exchange
  - ISO/IEC 15944-10:2013 Part 10: IT-enabled coded domains as semantic components in business transactions
  - ISO/IEC 15944-20:2015 Part 20: Linking business operational view to functional service view
- ISO/IEC 15945:2002 Information technology - Security techniques - Specification of TTP services to support the application of digital signatures
- ISO/IEC 15946 Information technology - Security techniques - Cryptographic techniques based on elliptic curves
  - ISO/IEC 15946-1:2016 Part 1: General
  - ISO/IEC 15946-5:2017 Part 5: Elliptic curve generation
- ISO/IEC 15948 Information technology – Computer graphics and image processing – Portable Network Graphics (PNG): Functional specification
- ISO/IEC 15953:1999 Information technology – Open Systems Interconnection – Service definition for the Application Service Object Association Control Service Element
- ISO/IEC 15954:1999 Information technology – Open Systems Interconnection – Connection-mode protocol for the Application Service Object Association Control Service Element
- ISO/IEC 15955:1999 Information technology – Open Systems Interconnection – Connectionless protocol for the Application Service Object Association Control Service Element
- ISO/IEC 15961 Information technology - Radio frequency identification (RFID) for item management: Data protocol
  - ISO/IEC 15961-1:2013 Part 1: Application interface
  - ISO/IEC 15961-4:2016 Part 4: Application interface commands for battery assist and sensor functionality
- ISO/IEC 15962:2013 Information technology - Radio frequency identification (RFID) for item management - Data protocol: data encoding rules and logical memory functions
- ISO/IEC 15963:2009 Information technology - Radio frequency identification for item management - Unique identification for RF tags
- ISO 15970 Natural gas – Measurement of properties – Volumetric properties: density, pressure, temperature and compression factor
- ISO 15971:2008 Natural gas – Measurement of properties – Calorific value and Wobbe index
- ISO 15985:2004 Plastics – Determination of the ultimate anaerobic biodegradation and disintegration under high-solids anaerobic-digestion conditions – Method by analysis of released biogas
- ISO/IEC 15991:2003 Information technology – Telecommunications and information exchange between systems – Private Integrated Services Network – Specification, functional model and information flows – Call Priority Interruption and Call Priority Interruption Protection supplementary services
- ISO/IEC 15992:2003 Information technology – Telecommunications and information exchange between systems – Private Integrated Services Network – Inter-exchange signalling protocol – Call Priority Interruption and Call Priority Interruption Protection supplementary services
