= OREDA =

Reliability data source for the oil and gas industry

Offshore & Onshore Reliability Data
- OREDA official logo
- Abbreviation: OREDA
- Formation: 1981
- Founder: Norwegian Petroleum Directorate
- Type: Joint Industry Project (JIP)
- Purpose: Improving safety and cost-effectiveness in design and operation through collection and exchange of reliability data from topside, subsea and other equipment used in oil and gas exploration and production
- Members: BP Exploration Operating Company Ltd. Gassco; Petrobras S.A. Equinor; TotalEnergies OneTech S.A.
- Website: www.oreda.com

The Offshore and Onshore Reliability Data (OREDA) project was established in 1981 in cooperation with the Norwegian Petroleum Directorate (now Petroleum Safety Authority Norway). It is "one of the main reliability data sources for the oil and gas industry" and considered "a unique data source on failure rates, failure mode distribution and repair times for equipment used in the offshore and onshore industry. OREDA's original objective was the collection of petroleum industry safety equipment reliability data. The current organization, as a cooperating group of several energy companies, was established in 1983, and at the same time the scope of OREDA was extended to cover reliability data from a wide range of equipment used in oil and gas exploration and production (E&P). OREDA primarily covers offshore topside and subsea equipment, but does also include some onshore E&P, and some downstream equipment as well.

The main objective of the OREDA project is to contribute to an improved safety and cost-effectiveness in design and operation of oil and gas E&P facilities, through collection and analysis of maintenance and operational data, establishment of a high quality reliability database, and exchange of reliability, availability, maintenance and safety (RAMS) technology among the participating companies.

== History ==
Work on the OREDA project proceeds in phases spanning 2–3 years. Handbooks summarizing the data collected and other work completed were issued regularly.

- Phase I (1983–1985)
  The primary activity during this phase was the collection and compilation of offshore drilling installations, and the publication of these data in the first OREDA Handbook. This demonstrated the ability of the eight petroleum industry companies involved in the project to cooperate on safety issues. While data in this initial phase included a wide range of equipment types, the level of detail was not as complete as in later phases of the project.
  Data collected in this phase are published in the OREDA Handbook (1984 edition); Phase I data are not, however, included in the OREDA database.
- Phase II (1987–1990)
  To improve data quality, the project's scope was altered to include collection of production-critical equipment data only. Data began to be stored in a Windows OS database. The development of a tailor-made data collection and analysis program, the OREDA software, was begun.
  Data collected in this phase are published in the OREDA Handbook (1992 edition), which also contains re-published data collected in phase I.
- Phase III (1990–1992)
  The number of equipment categories included was increased, and more data on maintenance programs were collected. Data quality was improved following established "Guidelines for Data Collection" and via improved quality control. The user interface of the OREDA software was improved, and programming changes allowed it to be used as a broader-purpose tool for data collection.
  Data collected in this phase are published in the OREDA Handbook (1997 edition).
- Phase IV (1993–1996)
  New software for data collection and analysis was developed, plus specific software and procedures for automatic data import and conversion. Data collected were mainly for the same equipment classes as in phase III, and the data collection was — to a greater extent than previously — carried out by the companies themselves. Data on planned maintenance were also included.
  Data collected in this phase are published in the OREDA Handbook (2002 edition).
- Phase V (1997–2000)
  New classes of equipment were added to the project, coinciding with a greater emphasis on the collection of subsea data. Development of a new ISO standard, "Petroleum and natural gas industries — Collection and exchange of reliability and maintenance data for equipment" was begun; ISO standard 14224 was issued in July 1999.
  Data collected in this phase are published in the OREDA Handbook (2002 edition).
- Phase VI (2000–2001)
  Data collection on subsea equipment and new equipment classes were prioritised. A forum for co-operation between major subsea equipment manufacturers was formed.
  Data collected in this phase are published in the OREDA Handbook (2009 edition).

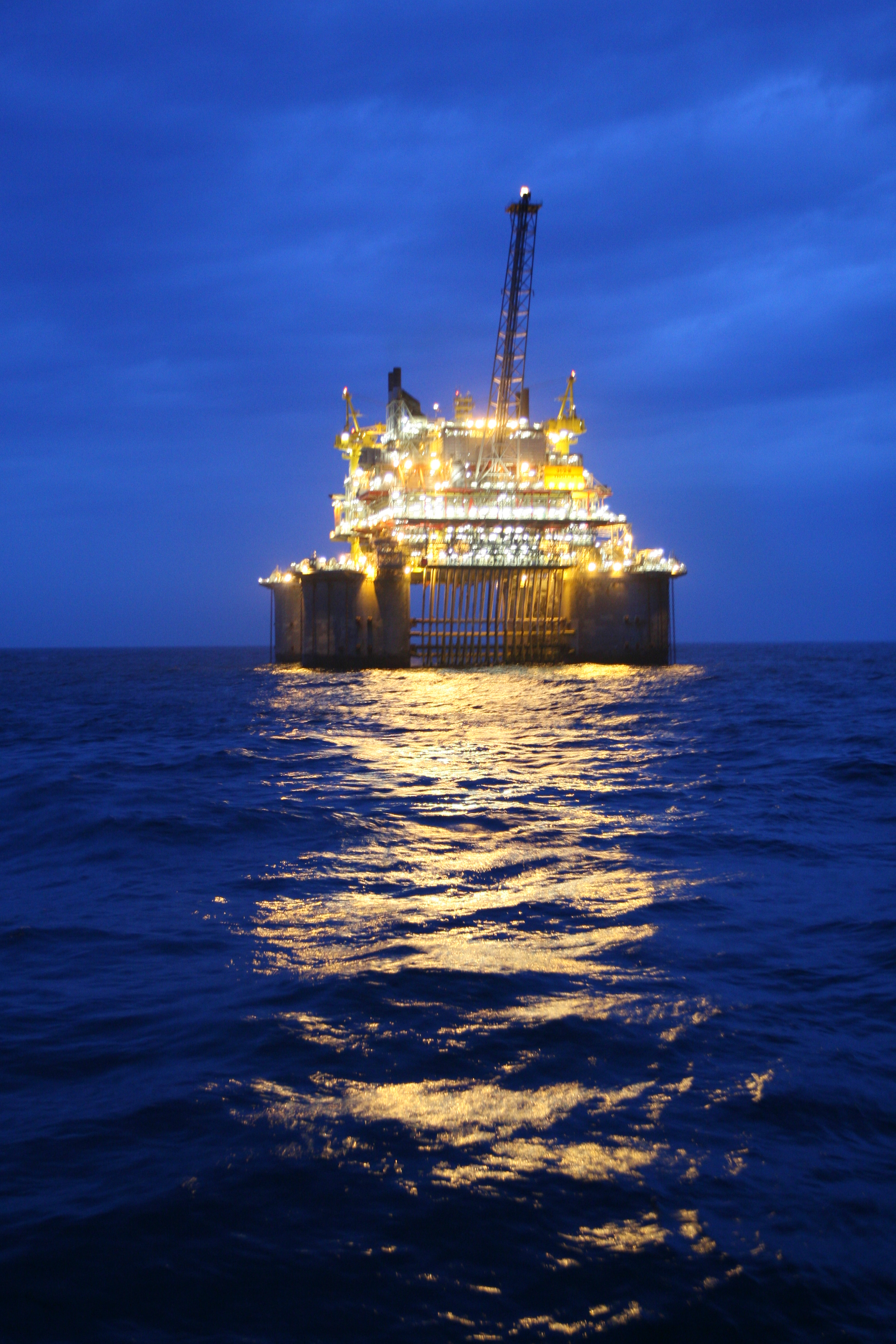
Troll B, the world's only semi-submersible platform made of concrete, in the Troll gas field (North Sea).

- Phase VII (2002–2003)
  Priority continued to be given to subsea equipment data collection. A revision of ISO 14224 was begun, with contribution from members of the OREDA project.
  Data collected in this phase are published in the OREDA Handbook (2009 edition).
- Phase VIII (2004–2005)
  Phase VIII mainly continued the goals and activities of phase VII. OREDA members participated in the revision of ISO 14224, issued in December 2006.
  Data collected in this phase are published in the OREDA Handbook (2015 edition).
- Phase IX (2006–2008)
  OREDA software and taxonomy were made consistent with ISO 14224. There was a continued focus on including worldwide safety data. In observance of OREDA's 25-year anniversary, a seminar was conducted.
  Data collected in this phase are published in the OREDA Handbook (2015 edition).
- Phase X (2009–2011)
  The 5th OREDA Handbook (2009 edition) was released; new safety analysis software was developed; initial steps to SIL (safety integrity level) data based on OREDA were taken; and GDF Suez and Petrobras became associated members.
- Phase XI (2012–2014)
  New data collection software was developed; the 6th OREDA Handbook (2015 edition) was planned; a quality assurance review of the database was conducted; a new logo was designed, as were new looks for both the Handbook and the website.
- Phase XII (2015–2017)
  During the 12th phase, the 6th OREDA Handbook (2015 edition) was published. A new webshop for the project has been established in collaboration with the European Safety Reliability & Data Association (ESReDA).
- Phase XIII (2018–2020)
  Digitalization and efficiency improvements was part of phase XIII work as there was a need for OREDA data decision support tools and as support for equipment in operation. Cost effective solutions was a focus area in the industry and in line with this trend the OREDA project provide more efficient procedures and digitalized solutions.
- Phase XIV (2021–2023)
  OREDA software changed from being a PC based installed application to a Software as a Service (SaaS) accessed by any modern web browser via OREDA. In 2021, direct access to a subset of the database was made available to third parties via DNV's Veracity Marketplace platform to replace the published handbooks, where companies or individuals can acquire single or multiple licenses to either, or both, the topside and subsea databases. Subscribers have access to topside data from phases VIII - XII and subsea data from phases VI - XII. A LinkedIn page for OREDA was also created with several page posts.
- Phase XV (2024–2026)
  Continuation of collecting failure data from oil & gas installation and potential lower carbon facilities is the plan for phase XV. Phase XIII topside and subsea data was released to third-party subscribers in 2024, with announcements on OREDA's LinkedIn page and OREDA's webpage.

== Participants ==
At times companies have left or joined the project, sometimes as the result of name changes or mergers. The following table lists which companies have contributed data to the OREDA project in phases XII, XIII and XIV.

Companies	Phase XII	Phase XIII	Phase XIV
BP Exploration Operating Company Ltd.	✔	✔	✔
Neptune Energy (former names: Engie and GDF Suez)	✔	✔	
Eni S.p.A. Exploration & Production Division	✔		
GASSCO	✔	✔	✔
Petrobras S.A.	✔	✔	
Shell Global Solutions UK	✔		
Equinor	✔	✔	✔
MODEC			✔
Total S.A.	✔	✔	✔

Participating companies must be able to provide data to the project and also pay a nominal membership fee for project manager and database support & maintenance duties. Any organisation that can collect quality failure data and is interested in joining OREDA should in the first instance contact the OREDA project manager.

== Organization ==
The OREDA project's Steering Committee consists of one member and one deputy member from each of the participating energy companies. From these members, a chairperson is elected, and appoints a Project Manager to coordinate activities approved by the steering committee. The Project Manager is also responsible for data quality assurance. Det Norske Veritas (DNV, now called DNV GL), an international certification body and classification society, served as Project Manager during phases I and II and SINTEF (Stiftelsen for INdustriell og TEknisk Forskning; "Foundation for Scientific and Industrial Research" in English) during phases III–IX, after which DNV GL again took over Project Manager duties until December 2023. From 2024 OPRAL Limited has taken on the role as Project Manager. The OREDA Handbook releases have been prepared as separate projects, but in consultation with the OREDA Steering Committee; the last version, 2015's 6th Edition, was prepared by SINTEF and NTNU (Norges Teknisk-Naturvitenskapelige Universitet; "Norwegian University of Science and Technology" in English), and is marketed by DNV GL.

== Need ==
Before the OREDA project began collecting data, "no authenticated source of failure information existed for offshore installations," and risk assessments had to be made using "generic data from onshore petroleum plants and data from other industries."

== Data ==
By 1996, OREDA had collated data about 24,000 pieces of equipment in use in offshore installations, and documented 33,000 equipment failures. The severity of failures documented in the database are categorized as either critical, degradation, incipient, or unknown severity.

Data received from the participating companies are quality checked by the OREDA project manager and on acceptance are anonymised, with respect to the data contributor, before being transferred to the Release database. The manufacture names of the equipment are visible.

The current topside database (phase XIV) contains data from 330 installations, over 20,500 pieces of equipment, more than 40,500 failure records, and close to 85,000 maintenance records. The subsea database contains data from 185 installations, more than 3,100 equipment items, almost 8,000 subunits and over 64,000 maintainable items with more than 3,000 failure events. Access to the full database, to the search and analysis functions of the OREDA software, is restricted to the OREDA member companies and contractors working with member companies. Third party users can access a subset of the data and search filters by taking out an annual subscription to OREDA@Cloud through DNV Veracity Marketplace site OREDA@ Cloud | Veracity by DNV

== Database structure ==
Data are entered by installation and by owner. Each piece of equipment (e.g. a gas turbine) constitutes a single database inventory record, which includes a technical description of the equipment, and of its environmental and operating conditions, along with all associated failure events. Every failure event is given a set of data including failure cause, date, effect, and mode. Corrective and preventive maintenance data are also included.

== Software ==
The OREDA software handles data acquisition, analysis and collation. Features include advanced data search, automated data transfer, quality checking, reliability analyses, a tailor-made module for subsea data, and the option to configure user-defined applications. It can also be used to collect internal company data.

The software released in concert with the 6th edition of the OREDA Handbook, contains an expanded set of equipment classes, including common subsea components, subsea control systems, subsea power cables, subsea pumps, and subsea vessels.

In 2021, OREDA@Cloud (OREDA) was launched to replace the PC based installed database with access via any web browser application.

== Impact ==
Use of the OREDA database has "led to significant savings in the development and operation of oil and gas facilities."

OREDA's example has inspired the creation of similar inter-company cooperation projects in related fields, such as the SPARTA (System Performance, Availability and Reliability Trend Analysis) database created by the wind farm industry in the UK.
