= ISO 14006 =

ISO 14006, Environmental management systems - Guidelines for incorporating ecodesign, is an international standard that specifies guidelines to help organizations establish, document, implement, maintain, and continuously improve their ecodesign management as part of the environmental management system. The standard is intended to be used by organizations that have implemented an environmental management system in compliance with ISO 14001, but can help to integrate ecodesign into other management systems. The guideline is applicable to any organization regardless of its size or activity.

== Edition and revision ==
ISO 14006 was developed by ISO/TC207/SC1 Environmental management systems, and was published for the first time in July 2011. The second edition was published in January 2020.

ISO/TC 207 was established in the year 1993.

== Main requirements of the standard ==
The 'ISO 14006' adopts a scheme in 5 chapters in the following subdivision:

- 1 Scope
- 2 Normative references
- 3 Terms and definitions
- 4 Role of top management in ecodesign
- 5 Guidelines for incorporating ecodesign into an EMS
- 6 Ecodesign activities in product design and development

== History ==
Year	Description
2011	ISO 14006 (1st Edition)
2020	ISO 14006 (2nd Edition)

== Related entries ==
- ISO 14000
- Environmental management system (EMS)
- Ecodesign
- ISO standard
- List of International Organization for Standardization standards (ISO)
- European Committee for Standardization (CEN)
