= Eco-Management and Audit Scheme =

International standard for environment management systems

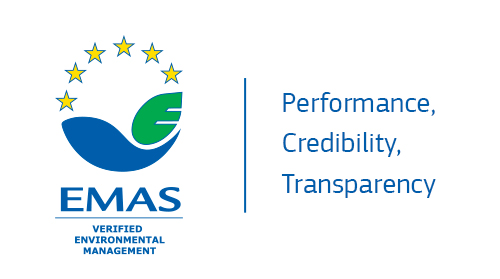
Logo

Eco-Management and Audit Scheme or Environmental Management and Audit Scheme (EMAS) is an international standard for environmental management systems. It was developed in March 1993 by European Commission. The goal of the standard is to enable organizations to assess, manage and continuously improve their environmental performance. The standard was designed to fit into an integrated management system. The scheme is globally applicable and open to all types of private and public organizations. In order to register with EMAS, organisations must meet the requirements of the EMAS Regulation. Currently, more than 4,600 organisations and more than 7,900 sites are EMAS registered.

== Regulation: structure ==
The EMAS Regulation entails 52 Articles and 8 Annexes:

- Chapter I: General provisions
- Chapter II: Registration of organisations
- Chapter III: Obligations of registered organisations
- Chapter IV: Rules applicable to Competent Bodies
- Chapter V: Environmental verifier's
- Chapter VI: Accreditation and Licensing Bodies
- Chapter VII: Rules applicable to Member States
- Chapter VIII: Rules applicable to the Commission
- Chapter IX: Final provisions
- Annex I: Environmental review
- Annex II: Environmental management system requirements (based on ISO 14001:2004) and additional issues to be addressed by organisations implementing EMAS
- Annex III: Internal environmental audit
- Annex IV: Environmental reporting
- Annex V: EMAS logo
- Annex VI: Information requirements for registration
- Annex VII: Environmental verifier's declaration on verification and validation activities
- Annex VIII: Correlation table (EMAS II/EMAS III)

Although EMAS is an official EU Regulation, it is binding only for organisations which voluntarily decide to implement the scheme. The EMAS Regulation includes the environmental management system requirements of the international standard for environmental management, ISO 14001, and additional requirements for EMAS registered organisations such as employee engagement, ensuring legal compliance or the publication of an environmental statement. Because of its additional requirements, EMAS is known as the premium instrument for environmental management.

== Implementation ==
In order to register with EMAS an organisation must comply with the following implementation steps (Article 4 of the EMAS Regulation):

1. Environmental review: initial comprehensive analysis of the organization's activities, products and services and their environmental impact; cataloging applicable environmental law, etc.
2. Environmental policy: definition of the organisation's overarching environmental objectives; commitment to continuous improvement of environmental performance.
3. Environmental program: description of measures, responsibilities and means to achieve environmental objectives and targets.
4. Environmental management system: part of an organisation's management entailing structure, planning activities, responsibilities, practices, procedures, processes and resources for developing, implementing, achieving, reviewing and maintaining the environmental policy and managing the environmental aspects.
5. Environmental audit: systematic, documented, periodic and objective evaluation of the organisation's environmental performance, management system and processes designed to protect the environment, conducted by internal auditor(s).
6. Environmental statement: comprehensive, regular reports to the public on the organisation's structure and activities; environmental policy and management system; environmental aspects and impacts; environmental programme, objectives and targets; environmental performance and compliance with applicable environmental law etc.
7. Verification and Registration: The steps above must be verified by an accredited/licensed environmental verifier; the validated environmental statement needs to be sent to the EMAS Competent Body (exists in each EU country) for registration and made publicly available before an organisation can use the EMAS logo.

=== Key performance indicators ===
The Eco-Management and Audit Scheme provides core indicators or key performance indicators (KPIs) with which registered organisations can measure their environmental performance and monitor their continual environmental improvement against set targets.

==== Key benefits of indicators ====
- Environmental performance can be reviewed and tracked regularly, which provides a basis for managerial decision-making leading to performance improvements
- Performance can also be compared against competitors to arrive at a benchmark
- The use of indicators leads to consistent monitoring and reporting throughout a (potentially globally dispersed) organisation
- External stakeholders gain an understanding of an organisation's environmental protection practices and are able to express opinions and suggest improvements

==== An indicator set according to EMAS ====
Entered into force in January 2010, EMAS III requires registered organisations to report on key performance indicators in six key environmental areas. The indicators focus on direct environmental aspects and apply to all EMAS registered organisations.

===== Energy efficiency =====
EMAS registered organisations have to report on two energy efficiency indicators:

    En1: Total annual energy consumption, expressed in MWh or GJ

The indicator En1 is a measure of the energy consumed, e.g. to produce a certain product. By applying the indicator, organisations can identify energy "hot spots", assess possible improvement measures and benchmark their production processes against similar organisations.

    En2: Percentage of En1 from renewable energy sources produced by the organisation

Through the application of En2, organisations can see how climate-friendly their energy use is. Renewable energy sources include:

- Electricity: Photovoltaic, wind power, hydro energy, biomass
- Heating: Solar energy, geothermal energy, biomass

===== Material efficiency =====
The EMAS environmental core indicator of material efficiency is:

    Ma: Annual mass flow of different materials used, expressed in tonnes

The indicator is useful for identifying the most important materials used and monitoring the effectiveness of improvement measures.

===== Water =====
The EMAS environmental core indicator on water is:

    W: Total annual water consumption, expressed in m3

The indicator enables organisations to assess the success of the measures taken to reduce water consumption.

===== Waste =====
The EMAS environmental core indicators on waste are:

    Wa1: Total annual generation of waste, broken down by type, expressed in tonnes

    Wa2: Total annual generation of hazardous waste, expressed in kilograms or tonnes

Hazardous wastes cause harmful environmental effects. As a result, the EMAS Regulation is clear on the fact that hazardous waste has to be reported under a specific indicator.

===== Biodiversity =====
The EMAS environmental core indicator on biodiversity is:

    B: Use of land, expressed in m2 of built-up area

By using the indicator, organisations can start monitoring their impact on ecosystems or habitats, through their land use.

===== Emissions =====
The EMAS environmental core indicators on emissions are:

    Em1: Total annual emissions of greenhouse gases, expressed in tonnes of CO2 equivalent

Greenhouse gas (GHG) emissions of an organisation indicate an organisation's impact on the climate. The indicator does not only focus on carbon dioxide emissions but also on other GHGs (see list above).

    Em2: Total annual air emission

The indicator requires an organisation to report on several air emissions (see list above). Using this indicator gives an organisation a thorough understanding of its impact on air quality.

== ISO 14001 ==
All organisations listed in the EMAS Register run an environmental management system according to the EMAS requirements. Because ISO 14001 is an integral part of EMAS, these organisations automatically comply with the requirements that the international standard demands as well. However, EMAS registered organisations fulfill requirements that go beyond the scope of ISO 14001. EMAS registered organisations demonstrate:

- Credibility: the proper implementation of EMAS is assessed by qualified and independent environmental verifiers.
- Transparency: by periodically reporting on their environmental performance. Those reports include information on key performance indicators. The reports must be validated by an environmental verifier.
- Continuous improvement process: by committing themselves to continuous improvement of their actual environmental performance. This performance is also evaluated by an environmental verifier. ISO 14001 only requires improving the environmental management system itself.
- Compliance: by fully complying with applicable environmental legislation.
- Stakeholder engagement: by involving employees and other stakeholders in order to benefit from their commitment, ideas, skills and experiences.

== Benefits and costs ==
EMAS is a comprehensive and demanding premium label, whose implementation requires some financial and personnel resources. In return, EMAS provides organisations with many advantages that can easily outweigh these costs. As EMAS is tailored to individual performance improvements, each organisation has to consider different environmental and economic factors. Given the heterogeneity of registered organisations, calculating average benefits and costs of EMAS is nearly unfeasible. The financial benefits of an EMAS registered organisation can differ per country. For example, some countries offer substantial reductions of waste fees, lower permitting costs, faster licensing procedures, etc. Nevertheless, several studies have been undertaken to provide reference points on the benefits and costs. In 2009, the European Commission published the Study on the Costs and Benefits of EMAS to Registered Organisations. The results of this study are summarised in a factsheet.

=== Key benefits ===
- Environmental and financial performance through a systematic framework: e.g. increased resource and energy efficiency, waste reduction.
- Risk and opportunity management: e.g. legal compliance, regulatory relief.
- Credibility, transparency and reputation: e.g. environmental statement, key performance indicators, verification and validation through independent environmental verifiers.
- Employee empowerment and motivation: e.g. improved involvement of staff, higher awareness, often leading to innovations.

=== Costs ===
- Fixed costs: validation/verification fees, registration fees, integrating EMAS logo into corporate design.
- External costs: consultancy expertise to support implementation and reporting, even if not mandatory, is often necessary.
- Internal costs: personnel and technical resources needed for implementing, administering and reporting.

== EMAS Awards ==
The EMAS Awards praise efforts on environmental protection made by EMAS registered organisations. The European Commission has handed out these awards every year since 2005. EMAS Awards in environmental management are handed out annually to companies and public authorities in six categories. EMAS Awards have a different focus every year. Each year, the EMAS Awards winners are cited for their achievements in a specific area of their environmental performance. Past themes have encompassed a variety of topics, including resource efficiency and waste management. The theme of the 2011 EMAS Awards is Stakeholder involvement leading to continuous improvement.

== Development ==
The first EMAS Regulation (EMAS I) was adopted in 1993 and became operational in 1995. It was originally restricted to companies in industrial sectors.

With the first revision of the EMAS Regulation in 2001 (EMAS II), the scheme opened to all economic sectors including public and private services. In addition, EMAS II was strengthened by the integration of the environmental management requirements of ISO 14001; by adopting a new EMAS logo to signal engagement to stakeholders; and by considering more strongly indirect effects such as those related to financial services or administrative and planning decisions.

The latest revision of EMAS came into effect on 11 January 2010 (EMAS III). With the introduction of EMAS III, the scheme is globally applicable and no longer limited to EU Member States. With EMAS III the EU also introduced obligatory Key Performance Indicators (KPI) in order to harmonize reporting on environmental performance. The number of EMAS registered organisations increased from 2,140 in 1997 to 4,659 in 2011.

== See also ==
- Environmental management system
