= Masaaki Imai =

Japanese business theorist

- Imai in 2023
- Born: 1 September 1930; Tokyo, Japan
- Died: 12 June 2023 (aged 92)
- Occupations: Author; management consultant
- Known for: Founding Kaizen Institute

Masaaki Imai (今井 正明, Imai Masaaki), 1930–2023, was a Japanese organizational theorist and management consultant known for his work on quality management, specifically on kaizen. Known as the father of Continuous Improvement (CI), Masaaki Imai has been a pioneer and leader in spreading the kaizen philosophy all over the world.

== Life and work ==
In 1986 Imai published Kaizen, The Key to Japan's Competitive Success, which was an instant global bestseller, firmly embedding the word kaizen in the corporate lexicon. It was the first book to introduce the Lean philosophy to the world. His firsthand account is based on his close associations and travels with Shoichiro Toyoda and Taichi Ohno. He studied from the success of Toyota and other Japanese companies and summarized and revealed the comprehensive business strategy as kaizen.

Imai's sequel book on this subject, Gembakaizen: A Commonsense, Low-cost Approach to Management, was published in 1997. This book uses relevant case studies to detail 21 practical kaizen management practices, including methodologies and tools to apply where the real action occurs. The result: greater productivity, quality, and profits achieved with minimal cost and time.

In keeping with his philosophy of never-ending continuous improvement, Mr. Imai founded Kaizen Institute in 1985, a global management consulting firm promoting kaizen and lean practices. The concept of kaizen is to make simple, common-sense improvements and refinements to critical end-to-end business processes- supporting the overall CI strategy of the organization. Today, companies around the world have used kaizen for greater productivity, speed, quality, and profits with minimal cost, time, and effort to get results and to become recognized industry leaders. Masaaki Imai continues to play a significant role as the Ambassador and visionary of the organization while actively participating.

In November 1998 Masaaki Imai received the Asia-Pacific Human Resource Development. Award in recognition of his immense contribution to business efficiency and productivity through the application of the philosophy of step-by-step improvement. In June 1999, he received the Shingo Research and Professional Research Prize for his book Gembakaizen. In 2010, he was awarded the first Honorary Fellowship of Quality Control in India. Further, in 2019, Masaaki Imai was awarded by the Asia Pacific Brands Foundation with "The BrandLaureate Legendary Award".

Masaaki Imai's latest book Strategic KAIZEN™ was published in 2021 and completed the trilogy of his authoritative work on the kaizen approach.

Massaki Imai died June 12, 2023 at 92 years of age.

== Kaizen ==
"KAI" means change, and "ZEN" means for the better, together "Change for the better". Kaizen refers to a philosophy or practices that focus upon Continuous Improvement regardless of the type of business or process. Masaaki Imai acknowledged that kaizen starts with the detection of needs and problem definition:

"The starting point for improvement is to recognize the need. This comes from the recognition of a problem. If no problem is recognized, there is no recognition of the need for improvement. Complacency is the archenemy of KAIZEN™."

== Awards and Recognitions ==
- 1998: "Asia-Pacific Human Resource Development Award."
- 1999 "Shingo Research and Professional Publication Prize" for the book Gemba Kaizen
- 2010: "Honorary Fellowship of Quality Control.”
- 2019: "The BrandLaureate Legendary Award."

== Selected publications ==
- 1975: "Never Take Yes for an Answer: An Inside Look at Japanese Business."
- 1986: "KAIZEN™: The Key to Japan's Competitive Success" (McGraw Hill)
- 1997: "Gemba Kaizen: A Commonsense, Low-cost Approach to Management" (McGraw Hill)
- 2012: "Gemba Kaizen: A Commonsense Approach to a Continuous Improvement Strategy, 2nd Edition" (McGraw Hill)
- 2021: "Strategic KAIZEN™: Using Flow, Synchronization, and Leveling [FSL™] Assessment to Measure and Strengthen Operational Performance" (McGraw Hill)
