= ISO 14031 =

ISO standard

The ISO 14031:2013 Environmental management - Environmental Performance Evaluation – Guidelines standard by the International Organization for Standardization (ISO) gives guidance on the design and use of environmental performance evaluation, and on identification and selection of environmental performance indicators, for use by all organizations, regardless of type, size, location and complexity.

== See also ==
- ISO 14000
- Sustainability accounting
