= ISO 14000 family =

Set of international standards for environment management systems

The ISO 14000 family is a set of international standards for environment management systems. It was developed in March 1996 by International Organization for Standardization. The goal of these standards is to help organizations (a) minimize how their operations (processes, etc.) negatively affect the environment (i.e. cause adverse changes to air, water, or land); (b) comply with applicable laws, regulations, and other environmentally oriented requirements; and (c) continually improve in the above. The standards were designed to fit into an integrated management system.

ISO 14000 is similar to ISO 9000 quality management in that both pertain to the process of how a service/product is rendered, rather than to the service/product itself. As with ISO 9001, certification is performed by third-party organizations rather than being awarded by ISO directly. The ISO 19011 and ISO 17021 audit standards apply when audits are being performed. The current version of ISO 14001 is ISO 14001:2026, which was published in April 2026.

The requirements of ISO 14001 are an integral part of the Eco-Management and Audit Scheme (EMAS). EMAS's structure and material are more demanding, mainly concerning performance improvement, legal compliance, and reporting duties.

== History ==
In March 1992, BSI published the world's first environmental management systems standard, BS 7750, as part of a response to growing concerns about the environment. BS 7750 supplied the template for the development of the ISO 14000 series in March 1996, by ISO. As of 2017, more than 300,000 certifications to ISO 14001 can be found in 171 countries.

Prior to the development of the ISO 14000 series, organizations voluntarily constructed their own EMSs, but this made comparisons of environmental effects between companies difficult; therefore, the universal ISO 14000 series was developed. An EMS is defined by ISO as: "part of the overall management system, that includes organizational structure, planning activities, responsibilities, practices, procedures, processes, and resources for developing, implementing, achieving, and maintaining the environmental policy."

== Development of the ISO 14000 series ==
The ISO 14000 family includes most notably the ISO 14001 standard, which represents the core set of standards used by organizations for designing and implementing an effective environmental management system (EMS). Other standards in this series include ISO 14004, which gives additional guidelines for a good EMS, and more specialized standards dealing with specific aspects of environmental management. The major objective of the ISO 14000 series of norms is to provide "practical tools for companies and organizations of all kinds looking to manage their environmental responsibilities."

The ISO 14000 series is based on a voluntary approach to environmental regulation. The series includes the ISO 14001 standard, which provides requirements for the establishment or improvement of an EMS. The standard shares many common traits with its predecessor, ISO 9000, the international standard of quality management, which served as a model for its internal structure, and both can be implemented side by side. As with ISO 9000, ISO 14000 acts both as an internal management tool and as a way of demonstrating a company's environmental commitment to interested parties.

== ISO 14001 standard ==
ISO 14001 defines criteria for an EMS. It does not state requirements for environmental performance but maps out a framework that a company or organization can follow to set up an effective EMS. It can be used by any organization that wants to improve resource efficiency, reduce waste, and reduce costs. Using ISO 14001 can provide assurance to company management and employees as well as external stakeholders that environmental impact is being measured and improved. ISO 14001 can also be integrated with other management functions and assists companies in meeting their environmental and economic goals.

ISO 14001, like other ISO 14000 standards, is voluntary, with its main aim to assist companies in continually improving their environmental performance and complying with any applicable legislation. The organization sets its own targets and performance measures, and the standard highlights what an organization needs to do to meet those goals, and to monitor and measure the situation. The standard does not focus on measures and goals of environmental performance, but of the organization. The standard can be applied to a variety of levels in the business, from the organizational level down to the product and service level.

ISO 14001 is known as a generic management system standard, meaning that it is relevant to any organization seeking to improve and manage resources more effectively. This includes:

- single-site to large multi-national companies
- high-risk companies to low-risk service organizations
- the manufacturing, process, and service industries, including local governments
- all industry sectors, including public and private sectors
- original equipment manufacturers and their suppliers

Year	Edition
1996	1st Edition
2004	2nd Edition
2015	3rd Edition
2026	4th Edition

=== ISO 14001:2015 ===
All standards are periodically reviewed by ISO to ensure they still meet market requirements. On release of ISO 14001:2015, certified organizations were given a three-year transition period to adapt their environmental management system to the new edition of the standard. This version of ISO 14001 focuses on the improvement of environmental performance rather than the improvement of the management system itself. It also includes several new updates all aimed at making environmental management more comprehensive and relevant to the supply chain. One of the main updates asks organizations to consider environmental impact during the entire life cycle, although there is no requirement to actually complete a life cycle analysis. Additionally, the commitments of top management and the methods of evaluating compliance have also been strengthened. Another significant change linked ISO 14001 to the general management system structure, introduced in 2015, called the High Level Structure. Both ISO 9001 and 14001 use this same structure, making implementation and auditing more uniform. The new standard also requires the holder of the certificate to specify risks and opportunities and how to address them.

=== Basic principles and methodology ===
The PDCA cycle

The basic principles of ISO 14001 are based on the well-known Plan-Do-Check-Act (PDCA) cycle.

==== Plan: Establish objectives and processes required ====
Prior to implementing ISO 14001, an initial review or gap analysis of the organization's processes and products is recommended, to assist in identifying all elements of the current operation, and if possible, future operations, that may interact with the environment, termed "environmental aspects". Environmental aspects can include both direct, such as those used during manufacturing, and indirect, such as raw materials. This review assists the organization in establishing their environmental objectives, goals, and targets (which should ideally be measurable); helps with the development of control and management procedures and processes; and serves to highlight any relevant legal requirement, which can then be built into the policy.

==== Do: Implement the processes ====
During this stage, the organization identifies the resources required and works out those members of the organization responsible for the EMS' implementation and control. This includes establishing procedures and processes, although only one documented procedure is specifically related to operational control. Other procedures are required to foster better management control over elements such as documentation control, emergency preparedness and response, and the education of employees, to ensure that they can competently implement the necessary processes and record results. Communication and participation across all levels of the organization, especially top management, is a vital part of the implementation phase, with the effectiveness of the EMS being dependent on active involvement from all employees.

==== Check: Measure and monitor the processes and report results ====
During the "check" stage, performance is monitored and periodically measured to ensure that the organization's environmental targets and objectives are being met. In addition, internal audits are conducted at planned intervals to ascertain whether the EMS meets the user's expectations and whether the processes and procedures are being adequately maintained and monitored.

==== Act: Take action to improve performance of EMS based on results ====
After the checking stage, a management review is conducted to ensure that the objectives of the EMS are being met, the extent to which they are being met, and that communications are being appropriately managed. The set targets are evaluated and if they are not being achieved then they are reevaluated. Additionally, the review evaluates changing circumstances, such as legal requirements, in order to make recommendations for further improvement of the system. These recommendations are incorporated through continual improvement: plans are renewed or new plans are made, and the EMS moves forward.

==== Continual Improvement Process (CI) ====
ISO 14001 encourages a company to continually improve its environmental performance. Apart from the obvious – the reduction in actual and possible negative environmental impacts – this is achieved in three ways:

- Expansion: Business areas increasingly get covered by the implemented EMS.
- Enrichment: Activities, products, processes, emissions, resources, etc. increasingly get managed by the implemented EMS.
- Upgrading: The structural and organizational framework of the EMS, as well as an accumulation of knowledge in dealing with business-environmental issues, is improved.

Overall, the CI concept expects the organization to gradually move away from merely operational environmental measures towards a more strategic approach on how to deal with environmental challenges.

=== Benefits ===
ISO 14001 was developed primarily to assist companies with a framework for better management control, which can result in reducing their environmental impact. In addition to improvements in performance, organizations can reap a number of economic benefits, including higher conformance with legislative and regulatory requirements by adopting the ISO standard. By minimizing the risk of regulatory and environmental liability fines and improving an organization's efficiency, benefits can include a reduction in waste, consumption of resources, and operating costs. Secondly, as an internationally recognized standard, businesses operating in multiple locations across the globe can leverage their conformance to ISO 14001, eliminating the need for multiple registrations or certifications. Thirdly, there has been a push in the last decade by consumers for companies to adopt better internal controls, making the incorporation of ISO 14001 a smart approach for the long-term viability of businesses. This can provide them with a competitive advantage against companies that do not adopt the standard (Potoki & Prakash, 2005). This in turn can have a positive impact on a company's asset value (Van der Deldt, 1997). It can lead to improved public perceptions of the business, placing them in a better position to operate in the international marketplace. The use of ISO 14001 can demonstrate an innovative and forward-thinking approach to customers and prospective employees. It can increase a business's access to new customers and business partners. In some markets it can potentially reduce public liability insurance costs. It can also serve to reduce trade barriers between registered businesses. There is growing interest in including certification to ISO 14001 in tenders for public-private partnerships for infrastructure renewal. Evidence of value in terms of environmental quality and benefit to the taxpayer has been shown in highway projects in Canada.

=== Conformity assessment ===
ISO 14001 can be used in whole or in part to help an organization (for-profit or nonprofit) better manage its relationship with the environment. If all the elements of ISO 14001 are incorporated into the management process, the organization may opt to prove that it has achieved full alignment or conformity with the international standard, ISO 14001, by using one of four recognized options. These are:

1. make a self-determination and self-declaration, or
2. seek confirmation of its conformance by parties having an interest in the organization, such as customers, or
3. seek confirmation of its self-declaration by a party external to the organization, or
4. seek certification/registration of its EMS by an external organization.

ISO does not control conformity assessment; its mandate is to develop and maintain standards. ISO has a neutral policy on conformity assessment in so much that one option is not better than the next. Each option serves different market needs. The adopting organization decides which option is best for them, in conjunction with their market needs.

Option one is sometimes incorrectly referred to as "self-certify" or "self-certification". This is not an acceptable reference under ISO terms and definitions, as it can lead to confusion in the market. The user is responsible for making their own determination.

Option two is often referred to as a customer or 2nd-party audit, which is an acceptable market term.

Option three is an independent third-party process by an organization that is based on an engagement activity and delivered by specially trained accountants. This option was based on an accounting procedure branded as the EnviroReady Report, which was created to help small- and medium-sized organizations. Its development was originally based on the Canadian Handbook for Accountants; it is now based on an international accounting standard, ISRS 4400.

The fourth option, certification, is another independent third-party process, which has been widely implemented by all types of organizations. Certification is also known in some countries as registration. Service providers of certification or registration are accredited by International Accreditation Forum or national accreditation services such as UKAS in the UK.

=== ISO 14001 and EMAS ===
In 2010, the latest EMAS Regulation (EMAS III) entered into force; the scheme is now globally applicable, and includes key performance indicators and a range of further improvements. As of April 2017, more than 3,900 organizations and approximately 9,200 sites are EMAS registered.

==== Complementarities and differences ====
ISO 14001's EMS requirements are similar to those of EMAS. Additional requirements for EMAS include:

- stricter requirements on the measurement and evaluation of environmental performance against objectives and targets
- government supervision of the environmental verifiers
- strong employee involvement; EMAS organizations acknowledge that active employee involvement is a driving force and a prerequisite for continuous and successful environmental improvements.
- environmental core indicators creating multi-annual comparability within and between organizations
- mandatory provision of information to the general public
- registration by a public authority

==== ISO 14001 use in supply chains ====
There are many reasons that ISO 14001 should be potentially attractive to supply chain managers, including the use of the voluntary standard to guide the development of integrated systems, its requirement for supply chain members in industries such as automotive and aerospace, the potential of pollution prevention leading to reduced costs of production and higher profits, its alignment with the growing importance of corporate social responsibility, and the possibility that an ISO-registered system may provide firms with a unique environmental resource, capabilities, and benefits that lead to competitive advantage.

Research on the supply chain impact of ISO 14001 registration posited that potential positive impacts might include more proactive environmental management, higher levels of communication, higher levels of waste reduction and cost efficiency, better ROI, higher levels of customer relationship management, fewer issues with employee health, and a reduced number of safety incidents. This research concluded that ISO 14001 registration can be leveraged across the supply chain for competitive advantage.

== List of ISO 14000 series standards ==
- ISO 14001 Environmental management systems - Requirements with guidance for use
- ISO 14004 Environmental management systems - General guidelines on implementation
- ISO 14005 Environmental management systems - Guidelines for a flexible approach to phased implementation
- ISO 14006 Environmental management systems - Guidelines for incorporating ecodesign
- ISO 14015 Environmental management - Environmental assessment of sites and organizations (EASO)
- ISO 14020 to 14025 Environmental labels and declarations
- ISO/NP 14030 Green bonds -- Environmental performance of nominated projects and assets; discusses post-production environmental assessment
- ISO 14031 Environmental management - Environmental performance evaluation - Guidelines
- ISO 14040 to 14049 Environmental management - Life cycle assessment; discusses pre-production planning and environment goal setting
- ISO 14050 Environmental management - Vocabulary; terms and definitions
- ISO/TR 14062 Environmental management - Integrating environmental aspects into product design and development
- ISO 14063 Environmental management - Environmental communication - Guidelines and examples
- ISO 14064 Greenhouse gases; measuring, quantifying, and reducing greenhouse gas emissions
- ISO 14090 Adaptation to climate change — Principles, requirements and guidelines

== See also ==
- Environmental management system
