= ISO 14224 =

International standard

ISO 14224 Petroleum, petrochemical and natural gas industries -- Collection and exchange of reliability and maintenance data for equipment is the International Organization for Standardization (ISO) standard relating to the collection of data for the management of the maintenance of equipment, including reliability data. It covers both methodology for the collection of the data, and details of the data to be collected.

This standard has been last published in September, 2016, and the standard is, beginning 2022, at stage 90.60 ("International Standard under review") in accordance with the ISO international harmonized stage codes.
