= Environmental management system =

Thorough process

An environmental management system (EMS) is "a system which integrates policy, procedures and processes for training of personnel, monitoring, summarizing, and reporting of specialized environmental performance information to internal and external stakeholders of a firm".

The most widely used standard on which an EMS is based is International Organization for Standardization (ISO) 14001. Alternatives include the EMAS.

== Goals ==
The goals of EMS are to increase compliance and reduce waste:

- Compliance is the act of reaching and maintaining minimal legal standards. By not being compliant, companies may face fines, government intervention or may not be able to operate.
- Waste reduction goes beyond compliance to reduce environmental impact. The EMS helps to develop, implement, manage, coordinate and monitor environmental policies. Waste reduction begins at the design phase through pollution prevention and waste minimization. Waste can be limited by "reduce, reuse & recycle."
- Reduce resource usage by minimizing greenhouse gas dependency and opting for more greener options like solar or wind power generation.
- Reduce pollution by reducing the usage of fossil fuels and making sure that the waste material is either processed before being dumped or is made sure that it is of least harm to the society directly.

== Features ==
An environmental management system (EMS):

- Serves as a tool, or process, to improve environmental performance and information mainly "design, pollution control and waste minimization, training, reporting to top management, and the setting of goals"
- Provides a systematic way of managing an organization's environmental affairs
- Is the aspect of the organization's overall management structure that addresses immediate and long-term impacts of its products, services and processes on the environment. EMS assists with planning, controlling and monitoring policies in an organization.
- Gives order and consistency for organizations to address environmental concerns through the allocation of resources, assignment of responsibility and ongoing evaluation of practices, procedures and processes
- Creates environmental buy-in from management and employees and assigns accountability and responsibility.
- Sets framework for training to achieve objectives and desired performance.
- Helps understand legislative requirements to better determine a product or service's impact, significance, priorities and objectives.
- Focuses on continual improvement of the system and a way to implement policies and objectives to meet a desired result. This also helps with reviewing and auditing the EMS to find future opportunities.
- Encourages contractors and suppliers to establish their own EMS.
- Facilitates e-reporting to federal, state and provincial government environmental agencies through direct upload.

== EMS Model ==
The PDCA cycle

An EMS follows a Plan-Do-Check-Act, or PDCA, Cycle. The diagram shows the process of first developing an environmental policy, planning the EMS, and then implementing it. The process also includes checking the system and acting on it. The model is continuous because an EMS is a process of continual improvement in which an organization is constantly reviewing and revising the system.

This is a model that can be used by a wide range of organizations – from manufacturing facilities to service industries to government agencies.

== Accreditation ==
Environmental Management Systems can be accredited under ISO 14001.

== Other meanings ==
An EMS can also be classified as:

- a system which monitors, tracks and reports emissions information, particularly with respect to the oil and gas industry. EMSs are becoming web-based in response to the EPA's mandated greenhouse gas (GHG) reporting rule, which allows for reporting GHG emissions information via the internet.
- a centrally controlled and often automated network of devices (now frequently wireless using z-wave and zigbee technologies) used to control the internal environment of a building. Such a system namely acts as an interface between end user and energy (gas/electricity) consumption.

== See also ==
- Eco-Management and Audit Scheme
- Environmental resource management
- Industrial ecology
- ISO 14000
- Life-cycle assessment

== Literature ==
- Boiral, O 2007, 'Corporate Greening Through IS0 14001: A Rational Myth?', Organisation Science, vol. 18, no. 1, pp. 127–146.
- Burden, L. (2010). "How to up the EMS ante".
- Clements, R.B 1996, Complete Guide to ISO 14000, Prentice Hall, Upper Saddle River.
- Florida, R., & Davison, D. (2001). Gaining from green management: Environmental management systems inside and outside the factory. California Management Review, 43 (3), 64-85.
- Gastl, R (2009). "CIP in Environmental Management". Archived from the original on 12 February 2011. "English management summary of: Gastl, R 2009, Kontinuierliche Verbesserung im Umweltmanagement - die KVP-Forderung der ISO 14001 in Theorie und Unternehmenspraxis, 2nd Edition, vdf, Zurich-Switzerland"
- Melnyk, Steven A.; Robert P. Sroufe & Roger Calantone (2003). "Assessing the Impact of Environmental Management Systems on Corporate and Environmental Performance". Journal of Operations Management. 21 (3): 329–51. doi:10.1016/S0272-6963(02)00109-2.
- Sroufe, Robert. "Effects of Environmental Management Systems on Environmental Management Practices and Operations." Production and Operations Management. 12-3 (2003): 416–431.
