= IQA (disambiguation) =

IQA may refer to:

- The International Quidditch Association
- The Chartered Quality Institute (CQI), formerly known as The Institute of Quality Assurance (IQA)
- The International Quizzing Association
- Image Quality Assessment, the quantitative assessment of image degradation
- The Institute of Quarrying Australia

== See also ==
- Iqa', a system of Arabic rhythm
