= BAFE Fire Safety Register =

- Established: 1984
- Purpose: Scheme criteria for UKAS (United Kingdom Accreditation Service) Accredited Third-Party Certification
- Location: Fire Service College, Moreton-in-Marsh, UK
- Region served: UK
- Website: BAFE Fire Safety Register

BAFE Fire Safety Register is an independent fire safety registration body for the United Kingdom. BAFE establish, develop and monitor schemes for UKAS (United Kingdom Accreditation Service) Accredited Third-Party Certification for the fire safety industry.

== Schemes ==
UKAS (United Kingdom Accreditation Service) Accredited Third-Party Certification Bodies licensed to deliver the BAFE Schemes offer independent assessment of the following BAFE Schemes:

- Domestic Fire Detection and Fire Alarm Systems (BAFE Scheme no. DS301)
- Competency of Portable Fire Extinguisher Organisations and Technicians (BAFE Scheme no. SP101)
- Service and Maintenance of Dry and Wet Riser/Falling Installations (BAFE Scheme no. SP105)
- Fire Detection and Alarm Systems (BAFE Scheme no. SP203-1)
- Fixed Gaseous Fire Suppression Systems (BAFE Scheme no. SP203-3)
- Emergency Lighting Systems (BAFE Scheme no. SP203-4)
- Life Safety Fire Risk Assessment (BAFE Scheme no. SP205)
- Kitchen Fire Protection Systems (BAFE Scheme no. SP206)
- Evacuation Alert Systems (BAFE Scheme no. SP207)

== Home Office Guidance ==
Government of the United Kingdom Home Office fire safety guidance documents for business recommend the use of Third-Party Certificated products and services for fire protection.

"Third-party certification schemes for fire protection products and related services are an effective means of providing the fullest possible assurances, offering a level of quality, reliability and safety that non-certificated products may lack. This does not mean goods and services that are not third-party approved are less reliable, but there is no obvious way in which this can be demonstrated.

Third-party quality assurance can offer comfort both as a means of satisfying you that goods and services you have purchased are fit for purpose, and as a means of demonstrating that you have complied with the law." - Section 8 Quality assurance of fire protection equipment and installation (Ref: ISBN 9781851128150)
