= AS9100 =

International standard for aerospace management systems

- Quality Management Systems - Requirements for Aviation, Space and Defense Organizations
- First published: 1999
- Latest version: Revision D 2016
- Organization: Society of Automotive Engineers
- Base standards: ISO 9001
- Domain: Aerospace industry
- Website: www.sae.org/standards/content/as9100/

Aerospace 9100 (AS9100) is an international standard for aerospace management systems that is a widely adopted and standardized quality management system for the aerospace sector. It was developed in March 1999 by Society of Automotive Engineers. The goal of the standard is to provide for continual improvement, emphasizing defect prevention and the reduction of variation and waste in the aerospace industry supply chain and assembly process. The standard was designed to fit into an integrated management system.

AS9100 replaces the earlier AS9000 and fully incorporates the entirety of the current version of ISO 9001, while adding requirements relating to quality and safety. Major aerospace manufacturers and suppliers worldwide require compliance with AS9100 as a condition of doing business with them.

== History ==
Prior to development of AS9100 standards for Quality Management Systems, the U.S. military applied two specifications to supplier quality and inspection programs, respectively, MIL-Q-9858A Quality Program Requirements, and MIL-I-45208A Military Specification: Inspection System Requirements. For years these specifications had represented the basic tenets of the aerospace industry. However, when the U.S. government adopted ISO 9001, it withdrew those two quality standards. Large aerospace companies then began requiring their suppliers to develop quality programs based on ISO 9001. As technologies evolve, and industries become more specialized, it is likely that more updates will be made to these standards and additional specialty Quality Management Systems (QMS) requirements for various industries.

AS9000 (1997) Aerospace Basic Quality System Standard

As aerospace suppliers soon found that ISO 9001 (1994) did not address the specific requirements of their customers, including the DoD, NASA, FAA, and commercial aerospace companies including Boeing, Lockheed Martin, Northrop Grumman, GE Aircraft Engines and Pratt & Whitney, they developed AS9000, based on ISO 9001, to provide a specific quality management standard for the aerospace industry.

Prior to the adoption of an aerospace specific quality standard, various corporations typically used ISO 9001 and their own complementary quality documentation/requirements, such as Boeing's D1-9000 or the automotive Q standard. This created a patchwork of competing requirements that were difficult to enforce and/or comply with. The major American aerospace manufacturers collaborated to develop a unified quality standard based on ISO 9001:1994, which led to the creation of AS9000. Following its release, companies like Boeing discontinued their previous quality supplements in favor of complying with AS9000.

AS9100 (1999)

Although AS9000 satisfied immediate needs, it was recognized that OEMs operate globally—a trend that would only increase, so a global standard was needed. The new standardized document, called 9100, was still based on ISO 9001:1994(E), although it was published separately by each country's aerospace association or standards body (AS9100 in the U.S). AS9100 added 55 aerospace industry specific amplifications and requirements to ISO 9001:1994.

AS9100 Revision A (2001), Model for Quality Assurance in Design, Development, Production, Installation and Servicing

During the rewrite of ISO 9001 for the 2000 release, the AS group worked closely with the ISO organization. As the year 2000 revision of ISO 9001 incorporated major organizational and philosophical changes, AS9000 underwent a rewrite as well. It was released as AS9100 to the international aerospace industry at the same time as the new version of ISO 9001.

AS9100A was actually two standards referenced in one publication: Section 1 defines an updated QMS model aligned with the updated ISO 9001:2000 publication while Section 2 defines a legacy model aligned with ISO 9001:1994. Organizations that in the year 2001 were operating a QMS based on ISO 9001:1994 were permitted to conform to Section 2 with the expectation that they would then transition their QMS to Section 1.

AS9100 Revision B (2004), Quality Management Systems – Aerospace Requirements

As the period for transition from the 1994 to 2000 standards passed, AS9100B was released in 2004 as an administrative revision to delete Section 2 of the Revision A standard.

AS9100 Revision C (2009), Quality Management System – Requirements for Aviation, Space and Defense Organizations

The update of AS9100 from revision B to C is largely to address the following question: "Our supplier is repeatedly late on delivery and failing to meet our requirements, how is it possible that they still have their AS9100 certificate?" That is, the AS9100C changes are driven by repeated delivery of non-conforming product and repeated late delivery by organizations that held AS9100A/B certifications. Those organizations had documented controls that conformed to the standard, however, there were insufficient processes in place to assure effectiveness of those controls. The response in this AS9100 revision is to elevate the requirements for Risk Management and to make Risk Management an integrated theme throughout the standard.

A major challenge to AS9100B-compliant organizations was the new AS9100 auditing standards defined in AS9101 Revision D, which eliminates the clause-based compliance checklist and requires organizations to provide evidence of effectiveness of their systems and processes.

Summary of changes between AS9100B and AS9100C:

- Greater emphasis on risk management
- Introduces “Special Requirements”
- Introduces “Critical Items”
- Measure: Requirements conformance
- Measure: Delivery performance
- Adopt proven product development processes
- Eliminate “recurring corrective actions”

AS9100 Revision C was released in January, 2009, with considerable delay in application of the new version in audits, largely due to the delay in the release of AS9101 Revision D and auditor training to the increased auditing rigor of that update.

AS9100 Revision D (2016), Quality Management System – Requirements for Aviation, Space and Defense Organizations

The update of AS9100 from revision C to D includes the full text of ISO 9001:2015. In addition to aligning the structure of the aviation, space and defense requirements to the new structure of ISO 9001:2015, the following key changes were implemented:

- Product Safety was added in a new clause and in other areas
- Counterfeit Parts Prevention was added in a new clause and in other areas (this was already in place in the AS9110 and AS9120 standards)
- Risk clause was merged with the new ISO 9001 risk requirements along with an increased emphasis on risks in operational processes
- Awareness clause was added with reinforced requirements for awareness of individual contribution to product and service quality and safety along with ethical behavior
- Human Factors are included as a consideration in nonconformity management and corrective action
- Configuration Management was clarified and improved to address stakeholder needs

AS9100 Revision D was released on September 20, 2016 with a certificate transition period aligned with the ISO 9001:2015 transition.

== See also ==
- AS9000
- AS9110
- ISO 9001
- JIS Q 9100 (Japan)
