= United Kingdom Accreditation Service =

National accreditation body

United Kingdom Accreditation Service (UKAS)
- Abbreviation: UKAS
- Formation: 1995
- Type: National accreditation body
- Legal status: Company limited by guarantee
- Purpose: Accreditation
- Location: 2 Pine Trees, Chertsey Lane, Staines-upon-Thames, Middlesex TW18 3HR
- Region served: UK
- Members: Conformity assessment bodies, primarily British.
- Main organ: UKAS Board (Chairman – James Lindesay-Bethune)
- Parent organization: Department for Business and Trade
- Website: UKAS
- Remarks: Appointed as the sole National Accreditation Body, by the British Government as required by the Accreditation Regulations 2009 (S.I. No. 3155)

The United Kingdom Accreditation Service (UKAS) is the sole national accreditation body recognised by the British government to assess the competence of organisations that provide certification, testing, inspection and calibration services. It evaluates these conformity assessment bodies and then accredits them where they are found to meet relevant internationally specified standards.

== Functions ==
- UKAS assesses conformity assessment bodies for competence against internationally recognised standards
- UKAS accredits (recognising competence of organisations to provide conformity assessment tasks)
- UKAS issues accreditation certificates and schedules showing the limits of the accreditation for a particular conformity assessment body and permits the use of the UKAS mark on accredited certification provided that it is accompanied by the UKAS Accreditation Number of the accredited body. The validity of an accreditation should be checked on the UKAS website. UKAS certificates do not bear an expiry date.

== History ==
UKAS was set up in 1995 under a memorandum of understanding with the British government (between UKAS and the then Secretary of State for Trade and Industry). It resulted from the merger in 1995 of NAMAS (National Measurement Accreditation Service) and NACCB (National Accreditation Council for Certification Bodies). NAMAS was itself the result of a merger in 1985 of NATLAS (National Testing Laboratory Accreditation Scheme) formed in 1981 and BCS (British Calibration Service) formed in 1966.

== Structure ==
UKAS is a non-profit-distributing private company. It is operated in the public interest as a company limited by guarantee. It employs 190 staff and over 250 technical external assessors / experts.

UKAS has members (instead of shareholders) who represent those who have an interest in accreditation – national and local government, business and industry, purchasers, users and quality managers. The present members are:

- Secretary of State for Business, Energy and Industrial Strategy
- The Association of British Certification Bodies
- British Measurement and Testing Association
- Confederation of British Industry
- The Secretary of State for the Environment, Food and Rural Affairs
- Federation of Small Businesses
- The Local Authorities Coordinating Body of Regulatory Services
- Chartered Institute of Procurement & Supply
- The Chartered Quality Institute
- The Safety Assessment Federation
- Food Standards Agency
- Defence Procurement Agency
- Health and Safety Executive
- Public Health Laboratory Services
- British Retail Consortium

In 2010 UKAS acquired the CPA (Clinical Pathology Accreditation) from the medical royal colleges. It started ISAS (Imaging Services Accreditation Scheme) for the Royal College of Radiologists and the College of Radiographers.

== Standards covered ==
- ISO/IEC 17025
- ISO 15189
- ISO/IEC 17020
- ISO/IEC 17021
  - ISO 9001
  - ISO 14001
  - ISO 13485
  - ISO 19443
  - ISO 20000-1
  - ISO 28001
  - ISO 44001
  - ISO 45001
  - ISO/IEC 27001
  - ISO 50001
  - ISO 55001
  - ISO 22301
- ISO/IEC 17024
- ISO/IEC 17065
- ISO/IEC 17043
- ISO 17034
- ISO/IEC 14065
- ISO/IEC 17029
- ISO 20387

== See also ==
- Chartered Quality Institute
