= ISO 50001 =

International energy management standard

ISO 50001 Energy management systems - Requirements with guidance for use, is an international standard created by the International Organization for Standardization (ISO). It supports organizations in all sectors to use energy more efficiently through the development of an energy Management System. The standard specifies the requirements for establishing, implementing, maintaining, and improving an energy management system, whose purpose is to enable an organization to follow a systematic approach in achieving continual improvement of energy performance, including energy efficiency, energy security, energy use, and consumption.

The standard aims to help organizations continually reduce their energy use, and therefore their energy costs and their greenhouse gas emissions.

ISO 50001 was originally released by ISO in June 2011 and is suitable for any organization, whatever its size, sector or geographical location. The second edition, ISO 50001:2018 was released in August 2018.

The system is modelled after the ISO 9001 Quality Management System and the ISO 14001 Environmental Management System (EMS) and the 2018 version has clauses modular with both.

A significant feature in ISO 50001 is the requirement to "... improve the EnMS and the resulting energy performance" (clause 4.2.1 c). The other standards mentioned here (ISO 9001 and ISO 14001) both require improvement to the effectiveness of the Management System but not to the quality of the product/service (ISO 9001) or to environmental performance (ISO 14001). It is anticipated that by implementing ISO 9001 and 14001 together an organization would improve quality and environmental performance, but the standards do not currently specify this as a requirement.

ISO 50001, therefore, has made a major leap forward in 'raising the bar' by requiring an organization to demonstrate that they have improved their energy performance. There are no quantitative targets specified – an organization chooses its own then creates an action plan to reach the targets. With this structured approach, an organization is more likely to see some tangible financial benefits.

== Reasons for use ==
The main objective of the standard is to continually improve energy-related performance and energy efficiency and to identify energy reduction opportunities. This systematic approach will help organizations to establish ongoing systems and processes.

Consistent energy management helps organizations to realize untapped energy efficiency potential. They will benefit from cost savings and make a significant contribution to environmental and climate protection, for example by the permanent reduction of CO_{2} emissions. The standard should alert employees and in particular the management level to the immediate and long-term energy management gains that can be made. The organization can discover potential savings and competitive advantages. Furthermore, a significant image boost for the organization can be created.

Independent academic research has examined the benefits of ISO 50001 with more rigor and detail. A 2017 survey of 57 Spanish companies found that key positive impacts included energy savings, better environmental performance, impacts, and awareness, process optimization, and higher overall productivity.

== Background ==
Organizations of all types and sizes increasingly want to reduce the amount of energy they consume. This is driven by the need or desire to:

- reduce costs,
- reduce the impact of rising costs,
- meet legislative or self-imposed carbon targets,
- reduce reliance on fossil fuels, and
- enhance the entity's reputation as a socially responsible organization.

In tandem, governments increasingly want to reduce the Greenhouse Gas Emissions of their citizens and industries, and are imposing legislative mechanisms to compel carbon reduction more and more frequently.

In response, a range of energy management standards, specifications and regulations were developed in Australia, China, Denmark, France, Germany, Ireland, Japan, Republic of Korea, Netherlands, Singapore, Sweden, Taiwan, Thailand, New Zealand, and the United States.

Subsequently, the European Committee for Standardization (CEN) developed EN 16001:2009 Energy management systems. Requirements with guidance for use as a first international energy management standard. This was published in July 2009 and withdrawn in April 2012 as it had been superseded by ISO 50001.

== Development ==
The United Nations Industrial Development Organization (UNIDO) recognized that industry around the world needed to mount an effective response to climate change. It also noted a proliferation of national energy management standards that were emerging as a response to market demand for help with energy efficiency.

In April 2007, a UNIDO stakeholders meeting decided to ask ISO to develop an international energy management standard.

ISO for its part had identified energy management as one of its top five areas for the development of International Standards and, in 2008, created a project committee, ISO/PC 242, Energy management, to carry out the work.

ISO/PC 242 was led by ISO members for the United States (ANSI) and Brazil (ABNT). In addition, its leadership included the ISO members for China (SAC) and the United Kingdom (BSI Group) to ensure that developed and developing economies participated together in the project committee.

Experts from the national standards bodies of 44 ISO member countries participated and another 14 countries sent observers. Development organizations including UNIDO and the World Energy Council (WEC) were also involved.

ISO 50001 also drew on existing national and regional energy management codes and standards, including ones developed in China, Denmark, Ireland, Japan, Republic of Korea, Netherlands, Sweden, Thailand, the United States, and the European Union.

ISO 50001:2011 Energy management systems – Requirements with guidance for use was published on June 17, 2011.

ISO published a revised version of ISO 50001 in 2018. The revision reflects a desire to promote adoption of the standard among small and medium sized enterprises. It also incorporates ISO's "high level structure" for use where organizations wish to integrate a number of management system standards together.

In 2026, ISO published a related standard, 50100:2026, Energy management systems and energy savings – Decarbonization – Requirements with guidance for use that provides guidance for implementing organizations to reduce their energy-related greenhouse gas (GHG) emissions (ERGE), requiring demonstration of absolute ERGE reduction in alignment with ERGE target(s).

== Structure ==
The structure of ISO 50001 is designed according to other ISO management system standards, in particular ISO 9001 (Quality Management Systems) and ISO 14001 (Environmental Management Systems). Since all three management systems standards are based on the plan–do–check–act (PDCA) cycle, and now share the same high level structure, ISO 50001 can be integrated easily to these systems.

There are ten major components to ISO 50001:2018:

- 1.: Scope
- 2.: Normative references
- 3.: Terms and definitions
- 4.: Context of the organization
- 5.: Leadership
- 6.: Planning
- 7.: Support
- 8.: Operation
- 9.: Performance Evaluation
- 10.: Improvement

== Method ==
ISO 50001 provides a framework of requirements that help organizations to:

- develop a policy for more efficient use of energy,
- fix targets and objectives to meet the policy,
- use data to better understand and make decisions concerning energy use and consumption,
- measure the results,
- review the effectiveness of the policy, and
- continually improve energy management.

ISO 50001 focuses on a continual improvement process to achieve the objectives related to the environmental performance of an organization (enterprise, service provider, administration, etc.). The process follows a plan–do–check–act approach.

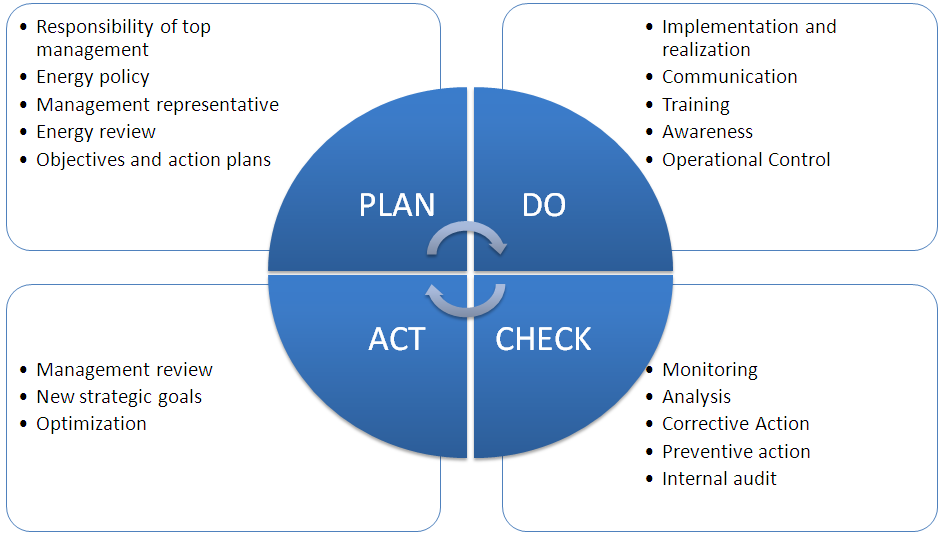
The 4 phases of the PDCA circle

- Plan:

The overall responsibility for the installed energy management system must be located with the top management. An energy officer and an energy team should be appointed. Furthermore, the organization has to formulate the energy policy in form of a written statement which contains the intent and direction of energy policy. Energy policy must be communicated within the organization. The energy team is the connection between management and employees. In this phase the organization has to identify the significant energy uses and prioritize the opportunities for energy performance improvement.

- Do:

The stated objectives and processes are now introduced and implemented. Resources are made available and responsibilities determined. Make sure that employees and other participants are aware of and capable of carrying out their energy management responsibilities. The realization of the energy management system starts.

- Check:

An energy management system requires a process for compliance and valuation of energy-related regulations. Internal audit can help to verify that the energy management system is functioning properly and generating the planned results. The processes are monitored with regard to legal and other requirements (customer requirements, internal policies) as well as to the objectives of the energy management of the organization. The results are documented and reported to top management.

- Act:

The top management prepares a written valuation based on the internal audit. This document is called the management review. The results will be evaluated on their performance level. If necessary, corrective or preventive actions can be initiated. Energy-relevant processes are optimized and new strategic goals are derived.

== Certification ==
Certification proves that the energy management system meets the requirements of ISO 50001. This gives customers, stakeholders, employees and management more confidence that the organization is saving energy. It also helps to ensure that the energy management system is working throughout the organization.

UKAS, the certification bodies' accreditation scheme in UK, accredits certification bodies to carry out certification of business energy management systems to ISO 50001. In July 2018, there were 15 UK bodies with the necessary accreditation to carry out independent audits and issue Energy Management Systems Certification to ISO 50001.

== Impact ==
ISO reported that the standard was warmly received by the market when it was first published. To the end of January 2012, around 100 organizations in 26 countries had already achieved certification to ISO 50001. ISO also listed several users who had reported significant early cost savings and benefits.

Early adopters have demonstrated meaningful savings. In China, Delta Electronics, a provider of power and thermal management solutions, reported reducing power consumption by 10.51 million kWh as compared to the same period in 2010. This is equivalent to a reduction of 10.2 thousand tons of carbon emissions and a saving of CNY 8 million ($1.2m).

In India, the Dahanu Thermal Power Station in Maharashtra expected to accrue annual savings of about INR 96.4 million ($1.7m) from raised energy efficiency and management.

In Austria, the municipality of Bad Eisenkappel, with 2,400 inhabitants, expected its consumption of energy to be reduced by nearly 25%, with the main savings achieved by updating the waste water plant and reducing energy consumption by 86 000 kWh, equivalent to €16,000 ($20.7k).

BSI Group published a case study showing that Sheffield Hallam University in the UK reduced its carbon emissions by 11% once it was certified to ISO 50001. This yielded annual savings of over £100,000 ($160.7k).

In December 2013, the UK Department of Energy and Climate Change became the first Central Government department to achieve certification against the requirements of ISO 50001, leading by example with the belief that structured energy management will lead to substantial energy reductions and thus mitigate the effects of climate change.

ISO has stated that it believes in due course the standard could influence up to 60% of the world's energy use. The 2025 ISO Survey of Management System Standard Certifications shows 47,394 valid ISO 50001 certificates for 109,501 sites in 127 countries, with China, Germany, France, Italy, Spain, and the U.K. with the largest numbers of certified sites.

== ISO 50001 and ISO 14001 ==
ISO 50001 is data driven and focuses on energy performance improvement, while ISO 14001 provides a more qualitative look at all significant environmental impacts of an organization. Both standards can be implemented individually or they can be integrated with each other, or with any other ISO management system standards, such as ISO 9001.

If energy is an organization's most significant environmental impact, ISO 50001 might be more appropriate than ISO 14001. Many organizations will manage energy successfully via ISO 14001, but especially in organizations where energy is a significant cost, ISO 50001 provides a more specific framework that enables organizations to apply a sharper focus to energy efficiency.

== History ==
Year	Description
2011	ISO 50001 (1st Edition)
2018	ISO 50001 (2nd Edition)
