= List of Six Sigma certification organizations =

This is a list of notable organizations that provide Six Sigma certification.

== Professional associations and consulting firms ==
- American Society for Quality (ASQ)
- Chartered Quality Institute (CQI)
- Institute of Industrial and Systems Engineers (IISE)
- The Performance Management Group LLC (TPMG)

== University certification programs ==
- Arizona State University
- Binghamton University, State University of New York
- Boston University
- Brigham Young University
- Brigham Young University - Hawaii
- California State University, Fullerton
- Case Western Reserve University
- Cleveland State University
- Cornell University
- Dartmouth College
- Emory University
- Franklin University
- Friends University
- George Washington University
- Georgia Institute of Technology
- Technische Universität Berlin
- Technical University of Munich
- The Hong Kong University of Science and Technology
- Indian Statistical Institute
- James Madison University
- Kent State University
- Louisiana Tech University
- Loyola University, Chicago
- McGill University
- Missouri Southern State University
- North Carolina State University
- Ohio State University
- Purdue University
- Rochester Institute of Technology
- Rutgers University
- Saint Vincent College
- San Diego State University
- San Jose State University
- Swinburne University of Technology
- Technical University of Munich
- The United States Military Academy
- University at Buffalo, The State University of New York
- University of Akron
- University of Amsterdam
- University of California, San Diego
- University of Colorado Boulder
- University of Dayton
- University of Houston
- University of Michigan
- University of South Carolina
- University of Texas at Austin
- University of Texas at El Paso
- University of Utah
- Utah Valley University
- Villanova University
- Western Kentucky University
