= EOQ =

EOQ may refer to:

- Economic order quantity (also known as EOQ Model), an economic model for inventory management
- European Organization for Quality, European organization acting for the development and management of quality in its widest sense
