= Ranjit Lal Jetley =

Indian general (1923–2018)

Major General Ranjit Lal Jetley
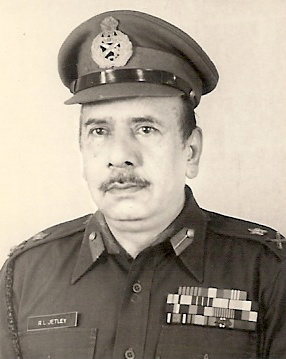
- Ranjit Lal Jetley
- Born: 10 March 1923; Rawalpindi, Punjab, British India
- Died: 30 March 2018 (aged 95); London, England, U.K.

Major-General Ranjit Lal Jetley, FIE, FIQA (10 March 1923 – 30 March 2018) was an Indian soldier and scientist. He served in World War II and the 1947 Indo-Pakistani War, becoming an artillery regiment commander. He went on to work in armaments research and development, his innovations including an Indian 10mm light field gun and upgunning of the Sherman tanks. He also contributed to set up two major laboratories. Jetley retired in 1979 and moved to the United Kingdom.

== Early life ==
Jetley was born in Rawalpindi to a military Punjabi-Brahmin family. His grandfather, Subedar Maya Das Jetley, held the Indian Distinguished Service Medal (IDSM), having served on the North Western frontier and in World War I; his father, Lt. Col Kundan Lal Jetley, MBE, participated with the British Expeditionary Forces in Burma and Shanghai, China during peace time, and served in World War II. Jetley's uncles, Major Mangal Sain Jetley, Major Inder Sen Jetley, also served in World War II.

Jetley's mother, Kaushaliya Rani, was the daughter of High Court advocate Shivram Jhingan. Jetley was educated at Quetta, Lansdowne and Dehra Dun, followed by higher education at the Gordon Mission College, Rawalpindi.

== Wartime career ==
Jetley was commissioned on 5 July 1942 and served in Arakan, Burma. He took part in the Battle of Ramree Island and the Allied landings at Letpan, mainland Burma, where, as naval Forward Observation Officer for a field artillery regiment, he called in the naval bombardment. From 1945 to 1946, he served with an Indian anti-tank regiment in Sumatra, Indonesia as a part of the British occupation.

In 1946, Jetley became a captain in the regular army and travelled to Britain for training at the Royal School of Artillery, Larkhill, along with Om Prakash Malhotra (later General Chief of Army Staff) and J. F. R. Jacob (later Lt General, Governor Punjab). In 1948, he took part in the Jammu & Kashmir Operations of the Indo-Pakistani War, involving the re-capture of Nowshera and Jhangar, capture of Rajouri and the Poonch linkup.

== Peacetime artillery service ==
From 1950, he served with the Technical Development Establishments at Jabalpur, Cossipore and later Kanpur and raised Inspectorates for the two major Ordnance Factories. At Kanpur he was credited for contributing to the manufacture of the first 25 Pounder Ordnance and the first Bren Gun in India. The occasion was celebrated by the Ordnance factory by firing of the first Bren Gun in the presence of Shri Rajendra Prasad, first President of India.

In 1952, he commanded an anti-tank regiment artillery. From 1953 to 1958, he commanded one of the then only two Medium Artillery Regiments and later raised the third Medium Regiment Artillery. With this newly raised unit, he earned a name in exercise 'Doaba' by taking his medium guns across the river Sutlej by dismantling, which was commended by the Corps Commander Lt. Gen. J. N. Chaudhari and Lt. Gen. Kulwant Singh, the chief Umpire and General Officer Commanding-in-Chief, Western Command. It was here that he also conceived the idea of up-gunning the Sherman Tank for better firepower and put up a paper to the General Staff. This was to have a salutary effect on the outcome of the 1965 Indo-Pakistani War.

== Scientific career ==
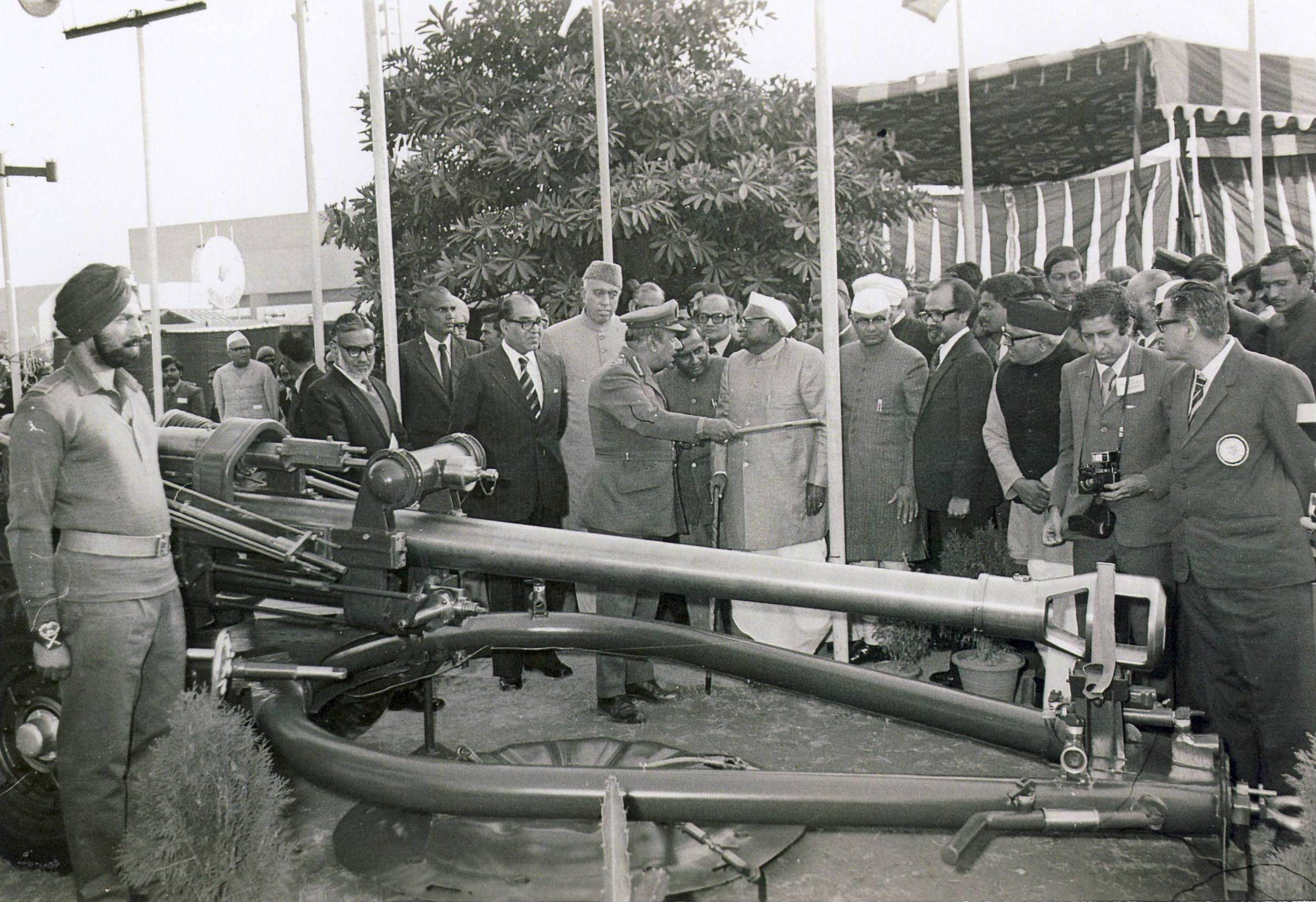
Maj. Gen Jetley demonstrating 105mm light field gun prototype designed by his team to Defence Minister Jagjivan Ram

During his second tenure (from 1958 onwards) with TDEs and the Defence Research and Development Organisation, he had a distinguished career in various capacities. As Superintendent, Proof and Experiment Establishment, he conceived, planned and modernised the previous ranges to enable enhancement of indigenous production and evaluation of foreign manufacturer's claims.

In addition to the normal call of duties, he had been personally responsible for projecting new ideas which led to the improvement in the performance of various service equipments. A few outstanding examples showing his ingenuity and skill were:-

- Mounting of 75 mm High Velocity French Gun on the Sherman tank.
- Conversion of 4.7" Naval Gun mounting to take 4.5" Naval gun.
- Modification of 25 Pdr carriage for high angle fire.
- Universal slave carriage/mounting for proof of any calibre gun and ammunition (Railway Open Wagon on broad gauge rails).

It is estimated that he saved over 1 billion of assets in the form of saving old tanks from disposal. Due to his efforts, the production of 4.5" ammunition in the country could begin at least one year earlier than by waiting for such facility to be provided by a foreign supplier. The facility was inaugurated by demonstrating proof of first lot of indigenous naval 4.5" ammunition in the presence of Admiral Katari, then Chief of the Naval Staff of India.

Later Jetley was assigned to the special Weapon Design Team. During this period his contribution for planning and organisation along with others resulted in establishing the Defence Research and Development Laboratories for rockets and missile.

Jetley's contribution was also admired in the raising of the Terminal Ballistic Research Laboratory for research in the field of transient phenomenon involving detonation of explosives.

Thus reasonable amount of credit for setting up of these two major laboratories equipped with most modern instrumentation goes to him.

He exhibited the first uncontrolled flight of a short range missile to the Defence Minister at Tuglakabad ranges in 1961 as desired by the Scientific Adviser Bhagwantam. This success had great contribution from Wing Commander Sethna and Bensal.

In 1968, he was assigned to the Directorate General of Inspection, a quality assurance organisation, where, as Senior Inspector of Armaments and Gauges, he further excelled his performance and was responsible for improving the quality of inspection of 40 mm anti-aircraft guns. He was also instrumental in enhancing the production of Mountain guns at Heavy Engineering Corporation at Ranchi and Gun Carriage Factory Jabalpur for which he was commended by the Secretary Defence Production and DGOF. He was hence sent for training to Sweden in Air Defence Systems with BOFORS and became a member of the Technical Committee for the Indian collaboration.

In 1971, he raised the Controllerate of Inspection (Weapons) which was a great bonus during the 1971 War for inspection of imported weapons. After war he contributed by making an assessment of the effect of Pakistani weapons which was a good guide for future improvements and defect investigations. From 1973 as Director of Inspection (Armaments), he was personally responsible for increasing the pace of indigenisation in the private sector. Later he helped in establishing the production of an anti-tank ammunition by revising acceptance criteria, after his return from the Jefferson Proving Grounds in the USA.

He encouraged the export of armaments as Director of Inspection (Armaments) and he was later nominated by the Defence Secretary to go to FFV Sweden to inspect the first 84 mm Carl Gustaf Rocket Launcher consignment.

He was assigned in 1976 to develop a Light Field Gun of 105 mm for the Army. In a very short period from the date of his take over, he produced the first proto-type involving induction of most modern materials (three new varieties of steel were developed at Durgapur steel plant) and sophisticated technology in the field of gun development resulting in a light carriage of half weight and India's first Ordnance design. Simultaneously, he developed a time fuze for the carrier shells of long range guns by modifying an existing time fuze. The development of Smoke and HESH ammunition for this light gun IFG Mark II and IFG Mark I had his contribution.

== Awards and recognition ==
For the exemplary work with his new ideas, he received under heading Honours and Awards in the Army Orders two commendation cards from the Chief of the Army Staff, one was on the recommendation of the Chief of the Naval Staff. Also, two of the first cash awards given by the Ministry of Defence, when introduced, went to him for his inventions. In view of his excellent allround performance in the field of engineering and applied technology, he was made a Fellow of Institution of Engineers (India) and Fellow of the Institution of Quality Assurance (UK).

Besides all other achievements to his credit for making an investigation of national importance of an armament store he was awarded the commendation card of the Secretary (Defense Production) in 1977.

Jetley rendered 37 years service and retired on 9 July 1979 after two extensions in the Service interest.

== Publications ==
Jetley has written a number of technical papers on the improvement in the performance of Army equipment, including a proposal to convert Stuart tanks to APCs. He has also published two books, one restricted for artillery officers promotion examination and one for the open market Rockets, Satellites and Guided Missiles.

His National Defence College paper on Future pattern of Weapons System (1970), led to him represent the course at the Parliamentarians' meeting on Atom Bomb considerations. This paper was later published in the USI magazine.

== Teaching ==
During his four years as Director of Studies (Army) at the Institute of Armament Technology, Jetley revised the Technical Staff Officers' Course by introducing studies for future armament needs, which resulted in an exercise to up-gun the T55 Tank with the British 105 mm Tank Gun. This was later adapted by the Army. He also introduced the Scientific Orientation Courses for Army Officers and compiled the Indian Army instructional pamphlet (Science) for the Army.

== His critical innovation ==
Credit for the availability of the up-gunned World War II vintage Shermans in 1965 to successfully combat the American supplied M48 Pattons goes to Jetley and to the General Staff of the Army, who provided him with a Sherman Tank to experiment for what was then a radical idea. The result is described in extract of two newspaper articles below. For this innovation he was paid merely ₹ 2000 as a cash award to kill the dream of Field Marshal Ayub Khan to capture Delhi.

- Extract from The Economic Times New Delhi Wednesday 6 September 1995 page 7 an article by Global Watch/K Subrahmanyam titled "The First War with Pak"

"Third, the Pakistanis has secretly raised a second armoured division while India had only one then...The Pakistani armoured division which was to break through at Khem Karan was totally destroyed by an Indian armoured brigade consisting of one Centurion regiment, one regiment of Sherman Mark IV tanks and another with up-gunned Shermans. The Sherman tanks were of World War II vintage. This happened because of the superior tactical skills of officer and men of the Indian Army. That battle was crucial in the sense if India had lost it the fate of the subcontinent would have changed...The country has to be overly grateful to the officers and men of that armoured brigade."

- Extract from The Indian Express New Delhi Friday 19 December 2003 Page 9 "Last Salute to the lion of 1965" (Lt. Gen Joginder Singh Dhillon; 1914–2003, Obituary) describes the result of Maj Gen Jetley's endeavours in the unglamorous field of defence research and development,

It is not possible to describe this 17-day war here but the decisive tank battle of Assal Utar, near Khem Karan, on September 10 does bear telling. Indian units hid their Sherman tanks 500 meters apart in a U-shaped formation in tall and unharvested sugarcane fields, and snared the enemy's vastly superior Patton tanks into this ambush, annihilating them to the last tank and deciding the outcome of the war. The destruction of Pakistan's armored pride and the casualties it suffered...

== Personal life ==
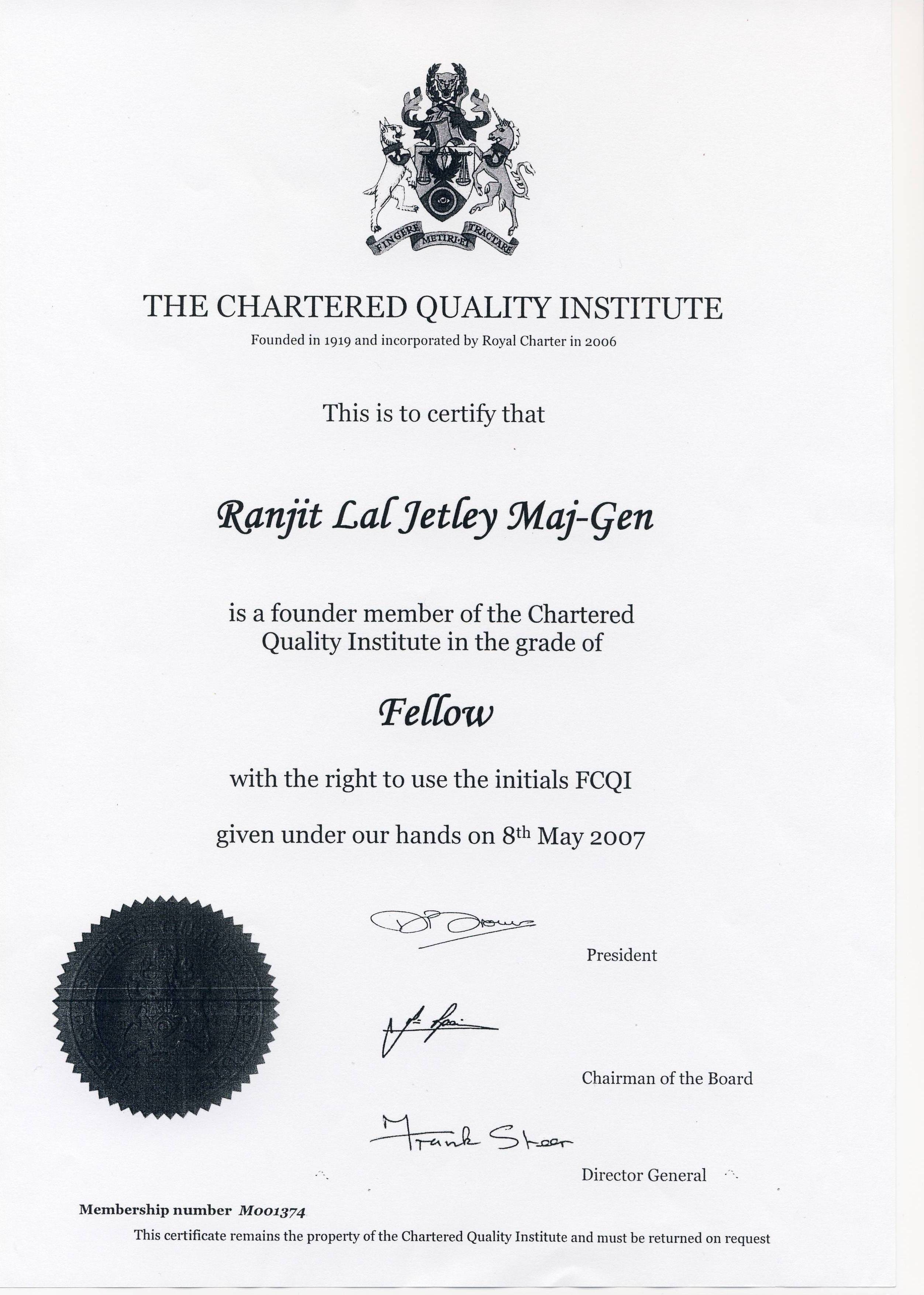
Certificate to prove Jetley as founder member of CQI

Jetley was the founder member of Chartered Quality Institute. He died in March 2018 at the age of 95.

== See also ==
- Burma Campaign
