= Jaitly =

Jaitley or Jaitly/Jetley is a Brahmin clan.

There are several other ways of spelling the name, including Jaiteley, Jaitli, Jetly, Jatley and Jetli.

== Notable people ==
Notable people bearing the name, who may or may not be associated with the Brahmins, include:

=== Jaitley ===
- Arun Jaitley (1952–2019), Indian politician

=== Jaitly ===
- Celina Jaitly (born 1981), Bollywood actress and model
- Jaya Jaitly (born 1942), Indian politician

=== Jetley ===
- Ranjit Lal Jetley (1923–2018), Indian major-general and scientist
