= AS9000 =

International standard for aerospace management systems

- Aerospace Basic Quality System Standard
- Status: Canceled
- First published: 1998
- Latest version: Revision A 2004
- Organization: Society of Automotive Engineers
- Base standards: ISO 9000
- Domain: Aerospace Industry
- Website: www.sae.org/standards/content/as9000/

Aero Space 9000 (AS 9000) is an international standard for aerospace management systems that is a widely adopted and standardized quality management system for the aerospace sector. It was developed in March 1998 by Society of Automotive Engineers. The goal of the standard is to provide for continual improvement, emphasizing defect prevention and the reduction of variation and waste in the aerospace industry supply chain and assembly process. The standard was designed to fit into an integrated management system.

The goal of it is similar to Boeing's D1-9000. The standard is based on ISO 9000, with 27 additional requirements unique to the aerospace industry. The intent is to standardize and streamline many of the other aerospace quality management standards.

== See also ==
- AS9100
