= ISO 21001 =

International management system standard

ISO 21001, Educational Organization Management Systems, is a published international standard by the International Organization for Standardization, and released on May 1, 2018. It is intended to provide a common management tool for organizations providing educational products and services capable of meeting learner and other beneficiary needs and expectations and it focuses on the specific interaction between an educational organization, the learner, and other relevant interested parties.

ISO 21001 specifies requirements for an Educational Organization Managements System (EOMS) when such an organization:

1. needs to demonstrate its ability to support the acquisition and development of competence through teaching, learning or research;
2. aims to enhance satisfaction of learners, other beneficiaries and staff through the effective application of its EOMS, including processes for improvement of the system and assurance of conformity to the requirements of learners and other beneficiaries

All requirements of ISO 21001 are generic and intended to be applicable to any organization that uses a curriculum to support the development of competence through teaching, learning or research, regardless of the type, size or method of delivery. ISO 21001 can be applied to educational organizations within larger organizations whose core business is not education, such as professional training departments, but does not apply to organizations that only produce or manufacture educational products.

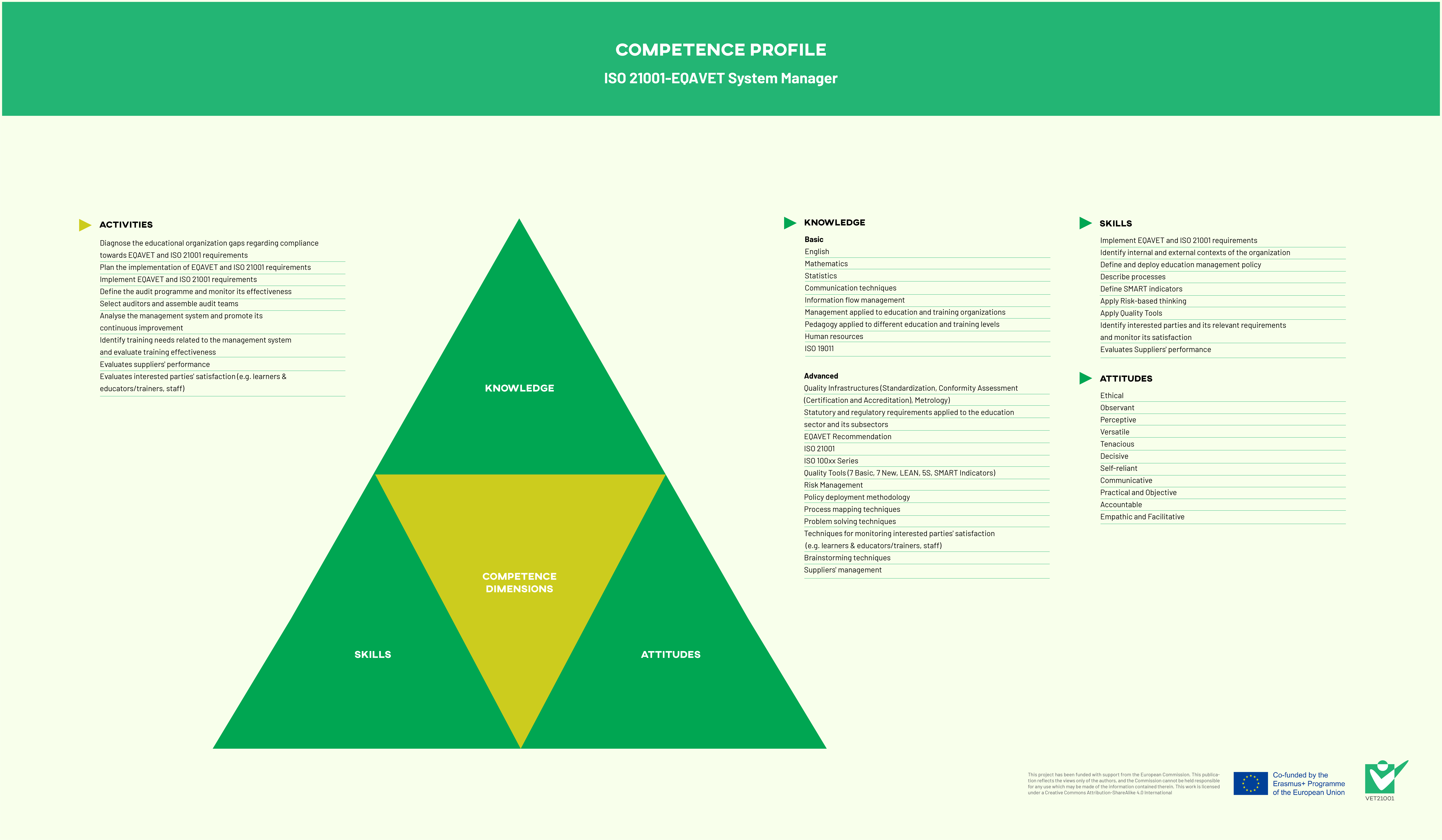

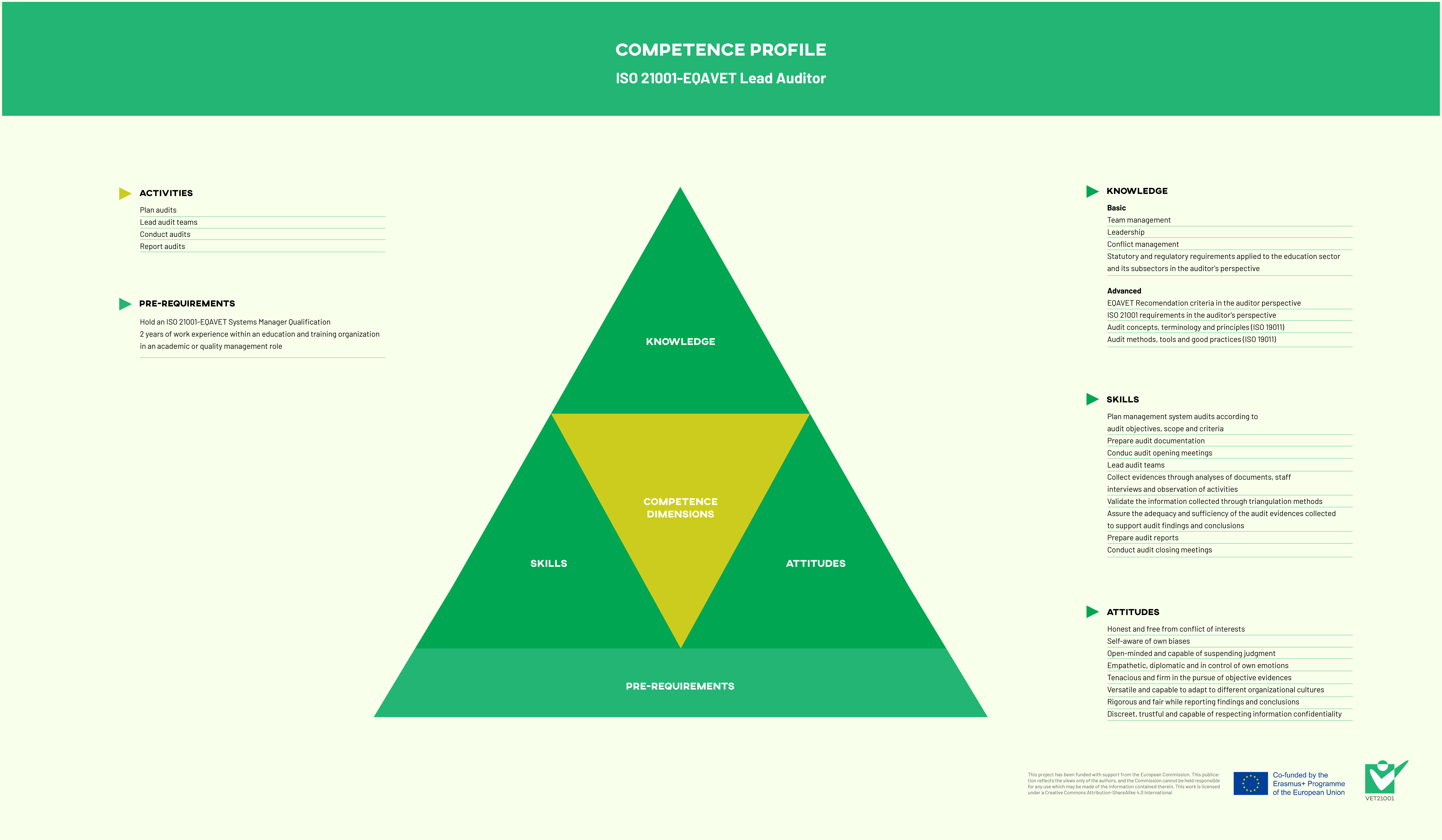

Relationship between ISO 21001 and other International Standards

ISO 21001 is a stand-alone management system standard, based on ISO 9001 (without being a sector application), and aligned with other ISO management system standards through the application of the ISO High Level Structure for management systems.

ISO 21001 can also be implemented alongside regional, national, open, proprietary and other standards or related documents and its Annex F provides an example of how to implement it alongside the European Quality Assurance Framework for Vocational Education and Training (EQAVET). The interaction of ISO 21001 with EQAVET is being explored by European Researchers. The ERASMUS+ VET21001 Project, funded by the European Commission has published Competence Profiles for the qualification of professionals who intend on working with ISO 21001-EQAVET integrated management systems, namely System Managers and Lead Auditors.

ISO 21001 Certification

Since its publication, many educational organizations have implemented and sought third party certification from conformity assessment bodies. To harmonize the approaches to accredited certification around the world, ISO developed ISO/TS 21030:2023 Educational organizations — Requirements for bodies providing audit and certification of educational organizations management systems. This new technical specification was developed at ISO CASCO/TC 232 JWG 58, a joint work group between CASCO, the ISO technical committee on conformity assessment and TC 232, the ISO technical committee on education and learning. The first draft of ISO/TS 21030 was based on a proprietary standard, the VET21001 Protocol, which is publicly available.
