= ISO/IEC 90003 =

ISO/IEC 90003 Software engineering -- Guidelines for the application of ISO 9001:2015 to computer software is a guidelines developed for organizations in the application of ISO 9001 to the acquisition, supply, development, operation and maintenance of computer software and related support services.

This standard was developed by technical committee ISO/IEC JTC 1/SC 7 Software and systems engineering.

ISO/IEC 90003 originally published as ISO 9000-3 for the first time in December 1997, was issued for the first time as an ISO/IEC 90003 in February 2004.

The review cycle of ISO 90003 is every 5 years.

== Main requirements of the standard ==
The ISO/IEC 90003:2014 adopts the ISO structure in 8 chapters in the following breakdown:

1. Scope
2. Normative references
3. Terms and definitions
4. Quality management system
5. Management responsibility
6. Resource management
7. Product realization
8. Measurement, analysis and improvement

== See also ==
- List of ISO standards
- List of IEC standards
- International Organization for Standardization
