= ISO 44001 =

Standard for collaborative working

ISO 44001 Collaborative business relationship management systems – Requirements and framework is an international standard published on 1 March 2017 by the International Organization for Standardization. It is based on British Standard BS 11000, initially developed from 2006 as PAS 11000 (2006). ISO 44001 is now aligned to the high level structure that covers some ISO management system standards, and incorporates the eight stage life cycle model that was the basis for BS 11000 to help business partners maximize the value of collaborative working:

- Operational awareness
- Knowledge
- Internal assessment
- Partner selection
- Working together
- Value creation
- Staying together
- Exit strategy implementation

BS 11000 was formally launched at the House of Lords in London on 7 December 2010.

The Institute for Collaborative Working, which promotes BS 11000 and ISO 44001, argues that there is a case for this standard because "as [businesses] see greater reliance on external parties to deliver solutions and an increase on contracting for outcomes, the emphasis on collaborative working will grow".

== Main requirements of the standard ==
The ISO 44001:2017 adopts the "ISO High Level Structure (HSL)" in 10 chapters in the following breakdown:

- 1 Purpose
- 2 Reference standards
- 3 Terms and definitions
- 4 Organization Context
- 5 Leadership
- 6 Planning
- 7 Support
- 8 Operating Activities
- 9 Performance Evaluation
- 10 Improvement

== History ==
Year	Description
2017	ISO 44001 (1st Edition)

== See also ==
- List of ISO standards
- Conformity assessment
- International Organization for Standardization
