= European Organization for Quality =

The European Organization for Quality (EOQ) is an autonomous, non-profit making association under Belgian law, having its legal office in Brussels. EOQ is the European interdisciplinary organization striving for effective improvement in the sphere of quality management as the coordinating body and catalyst of its National Representative Organizations (NR's). EOQ's Network comprises National Representative, Associated, Affiliated members’ and partners’ organizations from 40 countries, reaching up to 70,000 members and 500,000 companies linked to its members.

== History ==
The EOQ (at that time called European Organization for Quality Control - EOQC) was established in 1956 and the founding organizations came from five western European Countries: France, Italy, Western Germany, the Netherlands and the United Kingdom. The EOQ spread its roots into other western European countries, before establishing links with central and eastern European countries in what was then seen as a Communist bloc. More recently EOQ has widened its activities to include the countries of the southern and eastern Mediterranean region. EOQ Historical Data - Initiated Projects

- 2009 Technical Working Group (TWG) - elaboration of EOQ normative documents
- 2005 European Voluntary Registration System (EVROS)
- 2004 Business Leaders Club
- 2004 European Platform on transformation
- 2003 European Quality Leader
- 2002 Sustainable development
- 2001 EOQ Summer Camp
- 2000 European Quality Vision
- 1999 European Customer Satisfaction Index
- 1997 European Quality Award for SME
- 1996 Anticipation and breakthrough management
- 1995 European Quality Week
- 1992 European Quality Award for Business Excellence
- 1990 Certification of Quality Personnel
- 1990 European Quality Award for Leadership in TQM
- 1989 Yearly World Quality Day initiated by the EOQ
- 1987 EOQ moves from Quality Control to Quality Management
- 1985 National Quality Award
- 1960 Zero default
- 1950 Diffusion of statistic methods

== EOQ competence certification ==
EOQ's goal is to achieve mutual recognition of qualifications within Europe hence, the registration of EOQ certified professionals. EOQ supports all common activities, with respect to the qualification and registration/certification of EOQ certified professionals under the EOQ Harmonized Scheme for the Registration of Personnel (in the field of quality, environment, health and safety, risk, corporate social responsibility and specific sectors), the most successful product of EOQ. EOQ established this scheme, called EOQ's Personnel Registration Scheme, as a part of its mission to strengthen Europe's economic system by promoting improvement in all aspects of quality - from developments in quality systems management through to the use of quality as a competitive market force, by anticipating customer needs and creating customer confidence. For this purpose, the EOQ has formed a special unit, the EOQ Personnel Registration Unit (EOQ-PRU), who acts both as a clearing body and as a body for the recognition/certification and acceptance of EOQ certified professionals and deals with:

- Development and harmonization of EOQ Personnel Registration Schemes
- Registration and re-registration of EOQ certified professionals
- Assessment/recognition of PRU Agents for personnel competence certification

EOQ promotes the mutual recognition and acceptance of registrations/certificates within the framework of the scheme, actually based on mutual recognition through the European cooperation for Accreditation (EA), granted by its recognized members called EOQ-PRU Agents. Competence certificates based on EOQ normative documents have an outstanding reputation and are objective proof of competence due to the worldwide accepted processes of assessment, examination, certification and re-certification used in accordance with the ISO/IEC 17024 standard's requirements. Today EOQ counts more than 70,000 EOQ competence certificates holders. EOQ certificates have been commended for openness, transparency and credibility.

EOQ competence certifications

EOQ Profession	EOQ Code	Certificate validity (years)
Quality Operator	QO	5
Quality Assistant	QAS	5
Quality Professional (only for re-certification)	QP	5
Quality Management Technician	QMT	3
Quality Management Technician Junior	QMT Junior	6
Quality Management Representative (start 2013)	QMR	3
Quality Systems Manager (valid until 2015)	QSM	3
Quality Manager (start 2013)	QM	3
Quality Systems Manager Junior	QSM Junior	6
Quality Auditor	QA	3
Quality Lead Auditor (start 2013)	QLA	3
Quality Auditor Junior	QA Junior	6
Environmental Systems Manager	ESM	3
Environmental Systems Manager Junior	ESM Junior	6
Environmental Auditor	ESA	3
Environmental Auditor Junior	ESA Junior	6
Occupational Health and Safety Systems Manager	OHSSM	3
Occupational Health and Safety Systems Manager Junior	OHSSM Junior	6
Occupational Health and Safety Systems Auditor	OHSSA	3
Occupational Health and Safety Systems Auditor Junior	OHSSA Junior	6
Risk Manager	RM	3
TQM Assessor	TQMA	3
TQM Leader	TQML	3
CSR & Sustainability Manager	CSRM	3
CSR & Sustainability Assessor	CSRA	3
Management System Consultant	MSC	3
Management System Senior Consultant	MSSC	3
Quality Systems Manager in Healthcare	QSMH	3
Food Safety System Manager	FSM	3
Food & Safety Auditor	FSA	3
Information Security Management System Manager	ISMSM	3
Information Security Management System Auditor	ISMSA	3
Laboratory Quality Assurance Manager	LQAM	3
Laboratory Assessor	LA	3
Process Manager	PSM	3
