= ISO 10012 =

ISO measurement process management standard

ISO 10012 is a standard published by the International Organization for Standardization (ISO) which defines requirements for measurement process management and measurement equipment. The primary goals are to:

- Ensure measurement results are accurate and reliable
- Reduce measurement-related errors and risks
- Provide traceability of measurements to recognized standards

ISO 10012 is not a certification standard by itself. Instead, it acts as a supporting guideline, particularly for:

- ISO 9001 – quality management systems
- ISO/IEC 17025 – laboratory competence

Support quality management systems, particularly those based on ISO 9001

== Revisions ==
ISO 10012-1
1992 : Quality assurance requirements for measuring equipment – Part 1: Metrological confirmation system for measuring equipment. Applies to: testing laboratories, including those providing a calibration service; suppliers of products or services; other organizations where measurement is used to demonstrate compliance with specified requirements.
ISO 10012-2
1997 : Quality assurance for measuring equipment – Part 2: Guidelines for control of measurement processes
