= ISO 55001 =

ISO 55001 Asset management – Management systems – Requirements is a standard developed for the use of people or organizations involved in asset management. This standard was developed by ISO technical committee ISO/TC 251. ISO 55001 was published for the first time in January 2014.

== Main requirements of the standard ==
The ISO 55001:2014 adopts the "ISO High Level Structure (HLS)" in 10 chapters in the following breakdown:

- 1 Purpose
- 2 Reference standards
- 3 Terms and definitions
- 4 Organization context
- 5 Leadership
- 6 Planning
- 7 Support
- 8 Operating Activities
- 9 Performance Evaluation
- 10 Improvement

== See also ==
- List of ISO standards
- Conformity assessment
- International Organization for Standardization
