= Chartered Quality Institute =

Chartered body for quality professionals

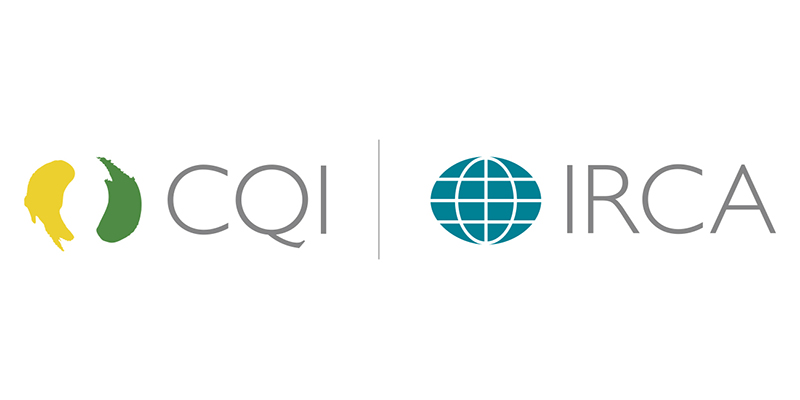
- Formation: 13 January 1919; 107 years ago
- Type: Chartered professional body
- Professional title: CQI and IRCA
- Headquarters: London, United Kingdom
- Coordinates: 51.5171°N 0.1115°W
- Region served: United Kingdom
- Services: Professional membership
- Chief Executive Officer (acting): Vince Desmond
- Chair of the Board: Ian Mitchell
- Main organ: Board of trustees
- Budget: GBP £5.1 million (2012)
- Website: www.quality.org
- Formerly called: Technical Inspection Association, Institution of Engineering Inspection, Institute of Quality Assurance

The Chartered Quality Institute (CQI), formerly known as the Institute of Quality Assurance (IQA), is a quality management company. The CQI owns the International Register of Certified Auditors (IRCA), a certification body for auditors of management systems.

== History ==
The UK government created the Ministry of Munitions, which placed inspectors in factories to ensure procedures were being followed. In 1919, the institute was first known as the Technical Inspection Association. The institute began with 500 members and was originally headquartered at its secretary's office at 44 Bedford Row, London WC1. On 10 November 1922, the Technical Inspection Association reformed as the Institution of Engineering Inspection. In 1929, the institute's branch network was formed.

In 1954, the British Productivity Council proposed either the formation of a Society for Quality Control, or that quality control should be incorporated as a branch of an existing society. The institute's council agreed. On 22 December 1955, a general meeting approved changes to the constitution. The institute began to consider offering professional qualifications in 1958. By the autumn of 1960, the institute had formed an education committee. Examinations started in the summer of 1960 with nine candidates.

In 1965, the council gave a change in name approval by 17 votes to 0. In 1972, the institute changed its name to Institute of Quality Assurance. In the 1990s, British Quality Foundation broke away from the IQA to form the British Quality Foundation. This was a result of the Henderson Committee report, which recommended a quality award for industry in the UK, following the success of the Malcolm Baldrige National Quality Award in the US.

== See also ==
- European Organization for Quality
- United Kingdom Accreditation Service
