= ISO 9000 family =

Set of international standards for quality management systems

The ISO 9000 family is a set of international standards for quality management systems. It was developed in March 1987 by the International Organization for Standardization (ISO). The goal of these standards is to help organizations ensure that they meet customer and other stakeholder needs within the statutory and regulatory requirements related to a product or service. The standards were designed to fit into an integrated management system. The ISO refers to the set of standards as a "family", bringing together the standard for quality management systems and a set of "supporting standards", and their presentation as a family facilitates their integrated application within an organisation. ISO 9000 deals with the fundamentals and vocabulary of QMS, including the seven quality management principles that underlie the family of standards. ISO 9001 deals with the requirements that organizations wishing to meet the standard must fulfill. A companion document, ISO/TS 9002, provides guidelines for the application of ISO 9001. ISO 9004 gives guidance on achieving sustained organizational success.

Third-party certification bodies confirm that organizations meet the requirements of ISO 9001. Over one million organizations worldwide are independently certified, making ISO 9001 one of the most widely used management tools in the world today. However, the ISO certification process has been criticised as being wasteful and not being useful for all organizations.

== History ==
In March 1979, BSI published the world's first quality management systems standard, BS 5750, as part of a response to growing concerns about the quality. BS 5750 supplied the template for the development of the ISO 9000 series in March 1987, by ISO. However, its history can be traced back some twenty years before that, to the publication of government procurement standards, such as the United States Department of Defense MIL-Q-9858 standard in 1959, and the United Kingdom's Def Stan 05–21 and 05–24. Large organizations that supplied government procurement agencies often had to comply with a variety of quality assurance requirements for each contract awarded, which led the defense industry to adopt mutual recognition of NATO AQAP, MIL-Q, and Def Stan standards. Eventually, industries adopted ISO 9000 instead of forcing contractors to adopt multiple—and often similar—requirements.

== Reasons for use ==
The global adoption of ISO 9001 may be attributable to several factors. In the early days, the ISO 9001 (9002 and 9003) requirements were intended to be used by procuring organizations, such as contractors and design activities, as the basis of contractual arrangements with their suppliers. This helped reduce the need for subcontract supplier quality development by establishing basic requirements for a supplier to assure product quality. The ISO 9001 requirements could be tailored to meet specific contractual situations, depending on the complexity of the product, business type (design responsibility, manufacture only, distribution, servicing, etc.), and risk to the procurer. For example, the food industry combined the ISO 9000 series with HACCP as a single management system. If a chosen supplier was weak in the controls of their measurement equipment (calibration), and hence QC/inspection results, that specific requirement would be invoked in the contract. Adopting a single quality assurance requirement also leads to cost savings throughout the supply chain by reducing the administrative burden of maintaining multiple sets of quality manuals and procedures.

A few years later, the UK Government took steps to improve national competitiveness following the publication of a white paper on Standards, Quality and International Competitiveness, Cmd 8621, and Third-Party Certification of Quality Management Systems was born under the auspices of the National Accreditation Council of Certification Bodies (NACCB), which has become the United Kingdom Accreditation Service (UKAS).

In addition to many stakeholders' benefits, several studies have identified significant financial benefits for organizations certified to ISO 9001, with an ISO analysis of 42 studies showing that implementing the standard enhances financial performance. Corbett et al. showed that certified organizations achieved a superior return on assets compared to otherwise similar organizations without certification.

Heras et al. found similarly superior performance and demonstrated that this was statistically significant and not a function of organization size. Naveha and Marcus claimed that implementing ISO 9001 led to superior operational performance in the U.S. automotive industry. Sharma identified similar improvements in operating performance and linked this to superior financial performance. Chow-Chua et al. showed better overall financial performance was achieved for companies in Denmark. Rajan and Tamimi (2003) showed that ISO 9001 certification resulted in superior stock market performance and suggested that shareholders were richly rewarded for the investment in an ISO 9001 system.

While the connection between superior financial performance and ISO 9001 may be seen from the examples cited, there remains no proof of direct causation, though longitudinal studies, such as those of Corbett et al. (2005), may suggest it. Other writers, such as Heras et al. (2002), have indicated that while there is some evidence of this, the improvement is partly driven by the fact that there is a tendency for better-performing companies to seek ISO 9001 certification.

The mechanism for improving results has also been the subject of much research. Lo et al. (2007) identified operational improvements (e.g., cycle time reduction, inventory reductions) as following from certification. Internal process improvements in organizations lead to externally observable improvements. The benefit of increased international trade and domestic market share, in addition to the internal benefits such as customer satisfaction, interdepartmental communications, work processes, and customer/supplier partnerships derived, far exceeds any and all initial investment.

== Global adoption ==
The increase in ISO 9001 certification is shown in the tables below.

Worldwide total of ISO 9001 certificates (end of each year)
2000	2001	2002	2003	2004	2005	2006	2007
409,421	510,616	561,747	567,985	660,132	773,867	896,929	951,486
2008	2009	2010	2011	2012	2013	2014	
982,832	1,064,785	1,118,510	1,111,698	1,096,987	1,126,460	1,138,155	

Top 10 countries for ISO 9001 certificates (2014)
Rank	Country	No. of certificates
1	China	342,802
2	Italy	168,960
3	Germany	55,363
4	Japan	45,785
5	India	41,016
6	United Kingdom	40,200
7	Spain	36,005
8	United States	33,008
9	France	29,122
10	Australia	19,731

Top 10 countries for ISO 9001 certificates (2010)
Rank	Country	No. of certificates
1	China	297,037
2	Italy	138,892
3	Russian Federation	62,265
4	Spain	59,854
5	Japan	59,287
6	Germany	50,583
7	United Kingdom	44,849
8	India	33,250
9	United States	25,101
10	Korea, Republic of	24,778

Top 10 countries for ISO 9001 certificates (2009)
Rank	Country	No. of certificates
1	China	257,076
2	Italy	130,066
3	Japan	68,484
4	Spain	59,576
5	Russian Federation	53,152
6	Germany	47,156
7	United Kingdom	41,193
8	India	37,493
9	United States	28,935
10	Korea, Republic of	23,400

== ISO 9000 series quality management principles ==
The ISO 9000 series are based on seven quality management principles (QMPs), namely:

The seven quality management principles
QMP 1	Customer focus	Organizations depend on their customers, both direct and indirect, and therefore should understand current and future customer needs, should meet customer requirements and strive to exceed customer expectations.
QMP 2	Leadership	Leaders establish unity of purpose and direction of the organization. They should create and maintain the internal environment in which people can become fully involved in achieving the organization's objectives.
QMP 3	Engagement of people	People at all levels are the essence of an organization and their full involvement enables their abilities to be used for the organization's benefit.
QMP 4	Process approach	A desired result is achieved more efficiently when activities and related resources are managed as a process.
QMP 5	Improvement	Improvement of the organization's overall performance should be a permanent objective of the organization.
QMP 6	Evidence-based decision making	Effective decisions are based on the analysis of data and information.
QMP 7	Relationship management	An organization and its external providers (suppliers, contractors, service providers) are interdependent and a mutually beneficial relationship enhances the ability of both to create value.

== Contents of ISO 9001:2026 ==
ISO 9001
- Status: Published
- Latest version: 6 September 2026; 1 month ago
- Organization: International Organization for Standardization
- Committee: ISO/TC 176/SC 2 Quality systems
- Series: ISO 9000 family
- Domain: Quality management systems
- Website: www.iso.org/standards/popular/iso-9000-family

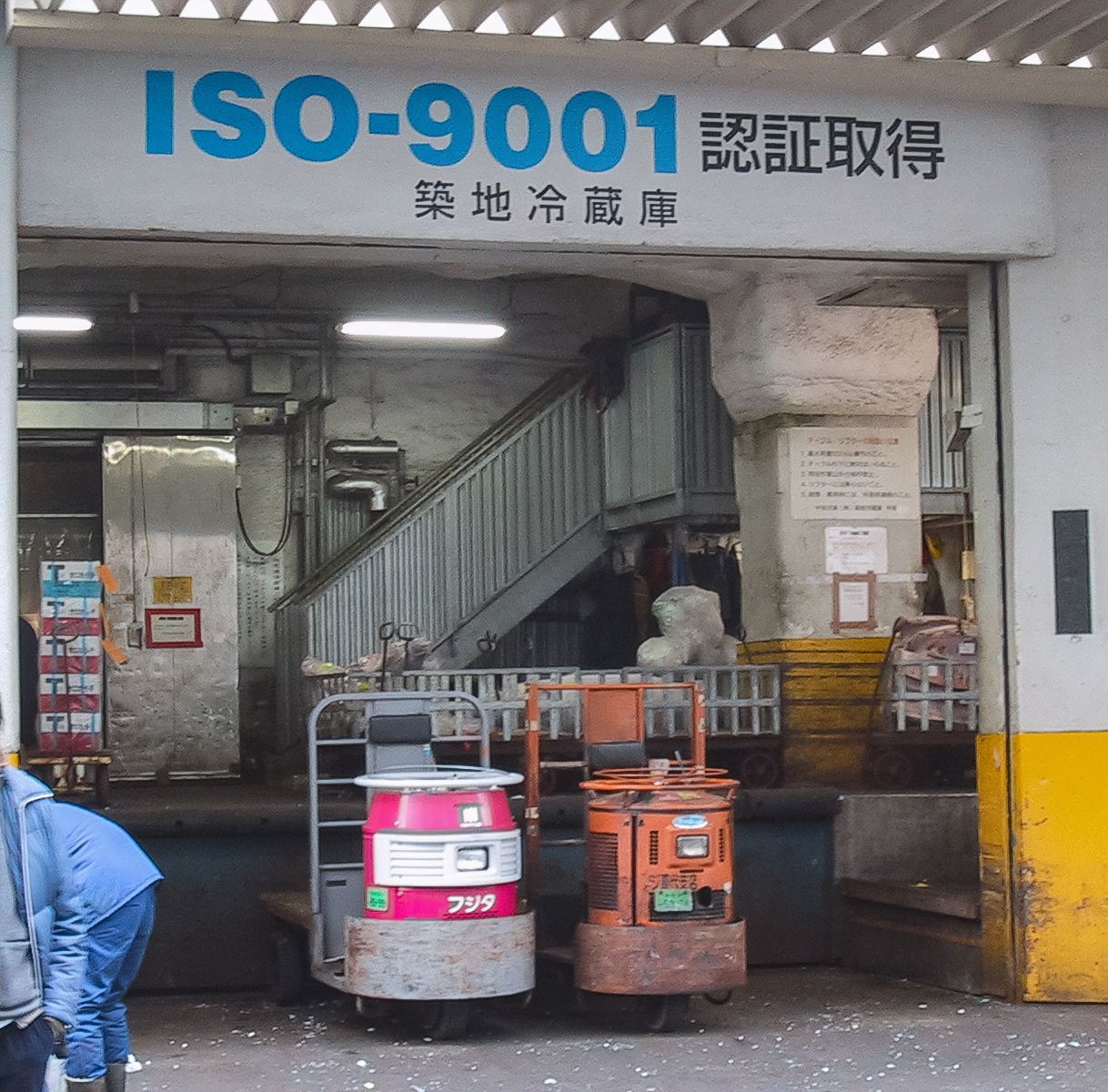
A fish wholesaler in Tsukiji, Japan advertising its ISO 9001 certification

ISO 9001:2026 Quality management systems – Requirements is a document of approximately 30 pages available from the national standards organization in each country. Only ISO 9001 is directly audited against for third-party assessment purposes.

Contents of ISO 9001:2026 are:

- Section 1: Scope
- Section 2: Normative references
- Section 3: Terms and definitions
- Section 4: Context of the organization
- Section 5: Leadership
- Section 6: Planning
- Section 7: Support
- Section 8: Operation
- Section 9: Performance evaluation
- Section 10: Improvement

Essentially, the layout of the standard is similar to the previous ISO 9001:2015 standard in that it follows the plan–do–check–act (PDCA) cycle in a process-based approach but is now further encouraging this to have risk-based thinking (section 0.3.3 of the introduction). The purpose of the quality objectives is to determine the conformity of the requirements (customers and organizations), facilitate effective deployment, and improve the quality management system.

Before the certification body can issue or renew a certificate, the auditor must be satisfied that the company being assessed has implemented the requirements of sections 4 to 10. Sections 1 to 3 are not directly audited against, but because they provide context and definitions for the rest of the standard, not that of the organization, their contents must be taken into account.

The standard no longer specifies that the organization shall issue and maintain documented procedures, but ISO 9001:2026 requires the organization to document any other procedures required for its effective operation. The standard also requires the organization to issue and communicate a documented quality policy, a quality management system scope, and quality objectives. The standard no longer requires compliant organizations to issue a formal Quality Manual. The standard does require the retention of numerous records, as specified throughout the standard. Changes relative to the 2015 edition concern leadership, quality culture, ethical behavior, risks and opportunities, planning of changes, organizational knowledge and operational control. The list of considerations for planning changes (clause 6.3) was expanded from four to seven factors, including communication of changes and the monitoring, evaluation and review of their results.

== Certification ==
The International Organization for Standardization (ISO) does not certify organizations themselves. Numerous certification bodies exist that audit organizations and issue ISO 9001 compliance certificates upon success. Although commonly referred to as "ISO 9000" certification, the actual standard to which an organization's quality management system can be certified is ISO 9001:2015 (ISO 9001:2026 came into force on 16 September 2026, with a three-year transition period for certified organizations). Many countries have formed accreditation bodies to authorize ("accredit") the certification bodies. Both the accreditation bodies and the certification bodies charge fees for their services. The various accreditation bodies have mutual agreements with each other to ensure that certificates issued by one of the accredited certification bodies (CB) are accepted worldwide. Certification bodies themselves operate under another quality standard, ISO/IEC 17021, while accreditation bodies operate under ISO/IEC 17011.

An organization applying for ISO 9001 certification is audited based on an extensive sample of its sites, functions, products, services, and processes. The auditor presents a list of problems (defined as "nonconformities", "observations", or "opportunities for improvement") to management. If there are no major nonconformities, the certification body issues a certificate. Where major nonconformities are identified, the organization presents an improvement plan to the certification body (e.g., corrective action reports showing how the problems will be resolved); once the certification body is satisfied that the organization has carried out sufficient corrective action, it issues a certificate. The certificate is limited by a particular scope (e.g., production of golf balls) and displays the addresses to which the certificate refers.

An ISO 9001 certificate is not a once-and-for-all award but must be renewed, in accordance with the requirements of ISO 17021, at regular intervals recommended by the certification body, usually once every three years. There are no grades of competence within ISO 9001: either a company is certified (meaning that it is committed to the method and model of quality management described in the standard) or it is not. In this respect, ISO 9001 certification contrasts with measurement-based quality systems.

== Evolution of ISO 9000 standards ==
The ISO 9000 standard is continually being revised by standing technical committees and advisory groups, who receive feedback from those professionals who are implementing the standard.

Year	Edition of ISO 9001
1987	1st Edition
1994	2nd Edition
2000	3rd Edition
2008	4th Edition
2015	5th Edition
2026	6th Edition

=== 1987 version ===
ISO 9000:1987 had the same structure as the British Standard BS 5750, with three specifications for quality management systems, the selection of which was based on the scope of activities of the organization:

- ISO 9001:1987 Model for quality assurance in design, development, production, installation, and servicing was for companies and organizations whose activities included the creation of new products.
- ISO 9002:1987 Model for quality assurance in production, installation, and servicing had basically the same material as ISO 9001 but without covering the creation of new products.
- ISO 9003:1987 Model for quality assurance in final inspection and test covered only the final inspection of finished product, with no concern for how the product was produced.

ISO 9000:1987 was also influenced by existing U.S. and other Defense Standards ("MIL SPECS"), and so was well-suited to manufacturing. The emphasis tended to be placed on conformance with procedures rather than the overall process of management, which was likely the actual intent.

=== 1994 version ===
ISO 9000:1994 emphasized quality assurance via preventive actions, instead of just checking final product, and continued to require evidence of compliance with documented procedures. As with the first edition, the down-side was that companies tended to implement its requirements by creating shelf-loads of procedure manuals, and becoming burdened with an ISO bureaucracy. In some companies, adapting and improving processes could actually be impeded by the quality management system.

=== 2000 version ===
ISO 9001:2000 replaced all three former standards of 1994 issues, ISO 9001, ISO 9002, and ISO 9003. Design and development procedures were required only if a company does, in fact, engage in the creation of new products. The 2000 version sought to make a radical change in thinking by actually placing front and center the concept of process management (the monitoring and optimization of a company's tasks and activities, instead of just inspection of the final product). The 2000 version also demanded involvement by upper executives in order to integrate quality into the business system and avoid delegation of quality functions to junior administrators. Another goal was to improve effectiveness via process performance metrics: numerical measurement of the effectiveness of tasks and activities. Expectations of continual process improvement and tracking customer satisfaction were made explicit.

ISO 9000 Requirements include:

- Approve documents before distribution;
- Provide correct version of documents at points of use;
- Use your records to prove that requirements have been met; and
- Develop a procedure to control your records.

=== 2008 version ===
ISO 9001:2008 in essence re-narrates ISO 9001:2000. The 2008 version only introduced clarifications to the existing requirements of ISO 9001:2000 and some changes intended to improve consistency with ISO 14001:2004. There were no new requirements. For example, in ISO 9001:2008, a quality management system being upgraded just needs to be checked to see if it is following the clarifications introduced in the amended version.

ISO 9001 is supplemented directly by two other standards of the family:

- ISO 9000:2005 "Quality management systems. Fundamentals and vocabulary"
- ISO 9004:2009 "Managing for the sustained success of an organization. A quality management approach"

Other standards, like ISO 19011 and the ISO 10000 series, may also be used for specific parts of the quality system.

=== 2015 version ===
In 2012, ISO/TC 176 – responsible for ISO 9001 development – celebrated 25 years of implementing ISO 9001 and concluded that it was necessary to create a new QMS model for the next 25 years. They subsequently commenced the official work on creating a revision of ISO 9001, starting with the new QM principles. This moment was considered by important specialists in the field as the "beginning of a new era in the development of quality management systems". As a result of the intensive work from this technical committee, the revised standard ISO 9001:2015 was published by ISO on 23 September 2015. The scope of the standard has not changed; however, the structure and core terms were modified to allow the standard to integrate more easily with other international management systems standards.

The new ISO 9001:2015 management system standard helps ensure that consumers can secure reliable, desired quality goods and services. This further increases benefits for a business.

The 2015 version is also less prescriptive than its predecessors and focuses on performance. This was achieved by combining the process approach with "risk-based thinking", and employing the Plan-Do-Check-Act cycle at all levels in the organization.

Some of the key changes include:

- High-Level Structure of 10 clauses is implemented. Now all new management system standards released by ISO will have this high-level structure
- Greater emphasis on building a management system suited to each organization's particular needs
- A requirement that those at the top of an organization be involved and accountable, aligning quality with wider business strategy
- Risk-based thinking throughout the standard makes the whole management system function as a preventive tool and encourages continuous improvement
- Less prescriptive requirements for documentation: the organization can now decide, in addition to the mandatory documents and records, what documented information it needs and in what format it should be
- Alignment with other key management system standards through the use of a common structure and core text
- Inclusion of knowledge management principles
- Quality Manuals and management representatives (MR) are no longer mandatory.

"Risk-based thinking" is seen as a development from a traditional approach to risk management, seen as the responsibility of a "risk manager", to an approach which sees risk management as "a fundamental way of thinking and decision making throughout [an] entire organization. The ISO and the International Accreditation Forum (IAF) have issued joint guidance on auditing practices covering risk-based thinking.

=== 2026 version ===
ISO 9001:2026 is the sixth edition of the international standard for quality management systems, replacing ISO 9001:2015. It is a measured revision rather than a fundamental rewrite, keeping the Harmonised Structure while strengthening requirements on leadership, quality culture, risk management and the planning and control of changes. It came into force on 16 September 2026, with a three-year transition period for certified organizations.

== Auditing ==
Two types of auditing are required to become registered to the standard: auditing by an external certification body (external audit) and audits by internal staff trained for this process (internal audits). The aim is a continual review and assessment process to verify that the system is working as it is supposed to, find out where it can improve, and correct or prevent identified problems. It is considered healthier for internal auditors to audit outside their usual management line to bring a degree of independence to their judgements. Supporting papers are provided by the ISO 9001 Auditing Practices Group. This is constituted as an informal group of quality management system (QMS) experts, auditors, and practitioners, drawn from the ISO Technical Committee 176 Quality Management and Quality Assurance (ISO/TC 176) and the International Accreditation Forum (IAF).

== Industry-specific interpretations ==
The ISO 9001 standard is generic; its parts must be carefully interpreted to make sense within a particular organization. Developing software is not like making cheese or offering counseling services, yet the ISO 9001 guidelines, because they are business management guidelines, can be applied to each of these. That being said there is no requirement to cite scientific or industrial guidelines/textbooks/journals. Diverse organizations—police departments (United States), professional soccer teams (Mexico), and city councils (UK)—have successfully implemented ISO 9001 systems.

Over time, various industry sectors have wanted to standardize their interpretations of the guidelines within their own marketplace. This is partly to ensure that their versions of ISO 9000 have their specific requirements, but also to try and ensure that more appropriately trained and experienced auditors are sent to assess them and even certify according to that interpretation.

- The TickIT guidelines are an interpretation of ISO 9000 produced by the UK Board of Trade to suit the processes of the information technology industry, especially software development.
- AS9000 is the Aerospace Basic Quality System Standard, an interpretation developed by major aerospace manufacturers. Those major manufacturers include AlliedSignal, Allison Engine, Boeing, General Electric Aircraft Engines, Lockheed-Martin, McDonnell Douglas, Northrop Grumman, Pratt & Whitney, Rockwell-Collins, Sikorsky Aircraft, Textron Aviation and Sundstrand. The current version is AS9100D.
- PS 9000 produced by The Pharmaceutical Quality Group a group within The CQI. The group publishes documents related to management of quality in the pharmaceutical sector.
- QS 9000 was an interpretation agreed upon by major automotive manufacturers (GM, Ford, Chrysler). It included techniques such as FMEA and APQP. QS 9000 has now been replaced by IATF 16949.
- IATF 16949:2016 is a sector scheme agreed upon by major automotive manufacturers (American, Japanese and European manufacturers); the latest version is based on ISO 9001:2015. The ISO/TS 16949:2009 standard was completely revised and reissued by IATF (International Automotive Task Force). IATF 16949:2016 is now a stand-alone standard that doesn't include the ISO 9001:2015 requirements but still refers to them and works as an additional automotive-specific requirement to ISO 9001.
- TL 9000 is the Telecom Quality Management and Measurement System Standard, an interpretation developed by the telecom consortium, QuEST Forum. In 1998 QuEST Forum developed the TL 9000 Quality Management System to meet the supply chain quality requirements of the worldwide telecommunications industry. The TL 9000 standard is made up of two handbooks: the QMS Requirements Handbook, and the QMS Measurement Handbook. The current versions of the Requirements and Measurements Handbooks are 6.0. Unlike ISO 9001 or other sector-specific standards, TL 9000 includes standardized product and process measurements that must be reported into a central repository, which allows organizations to benchmark their performance in key process areas against peer organizations. TL 9000 R6.0 contains the full text of ISO 9001:2015.
- ISO 13485:2016 is the medical industry's equivalent of ISO 9001. ISO 13485:2016 is a stand-alone standard. Because ISO 13485 is relevant to medical device manufacturers (unlike ISO 9001, which is applicable to any industry), and because of the differences between the two standards relating to continual improvement, compliance with ISO 13485 does not necessarily mean compliance with ISO 9001 (and vice versa).
- ISO/IEC 90003:2014 provides guidelines for the application of ISO 9001 to computer software.
- ISO/TS 29001 is quality management system requirements for the design, development, production, installation, and service of products for the petroleum, petrochemical, and natural gas industries. It is equivalent to API Spec Q1 without the Monogram annex.
- ISO 18091 is the guidelines for the application of ISO 9001 in local government.
- ISO/TS 54001 is the Quality management system with particular requirements for the application of ISO 9001:2015 for electoral organizations at all levels of government.
- ISO/IEC 17025:2017 is the Quality Management System applicable only to Testing and Calibration Laboratories.

== Effectiveness ==
The debate on the effectiveness of ISO 9000 commonly centres on the following questions:

1. Are the quality principles in ISO 9001 of value?
2. Does it help to implement an ISO 9001-compliant quality management system?
3. Does it help to obtain ISO 9001 certification?

The effectiveness of the ISO system being implemented depends on a number of factors, the most significant of which are:

1. Commitment of senior management to monitor, control, and improve quality. Senior managers must be strongly involved in the quality management activities, starting with the definition of a quality strategy for the organisation.
2. Motives to adopt the standard. Internal motives such as a genuine desire to improve the product quality, company processes, and process efficiency tend to facilitate the implementation of the standard and to increase the effectiveness of the certification. Organizations that implement an ISO system without this desire often take the cheapest road to get a certificate on the wall and ignore problem areas uncovered in the audits. External motives (such as stakeholder pressure or customer demand) tend to produce lower certification benefits.
3. Making a convenient analysis of the internal context of the company that wants to adopt the standard, preparing for the implementation of the standard (e.g. training), planning for the implementation of the standard in the organisation, and the organisational (personnel, culture) receptivity to the implementation of the standard.
4. The degree of effective implementation of the standard (i.e., internalization of the standard in the processes of the organization). That is, how well the ISO system integrates into current business practices. Many organizations that implement ISO try to make their system fit into a cookie-cutter quality manual instead of creating a manual that documents existing practices and only adds new processes to meet the ISO standard when necessary.
5. How well the ISO system focuses on improving the customer experience. The broadest definition of quality is "Whatever the customer perceives good quality to be." This means that a company doesn't necessarily have to make a product that never fails; some customers have a higher tolerance for product failures if they always receive shipments on-time or have a positive experience in some other dimension of customer service. An ISO system should take into account all areas of the customer experience and the industry expectations, and seek to improve them on a continual basis. This means taking into account all processes that deal with the three stakeholders (customers, suppliers, and organization). Only then can a company sustain improvements in the customer's experience.
6. How well the auditor finds and communicates areas of improvement. While ISO auditors may not provide consulting to the clients they audit, there is the potential for auditors to point out areas of improvement. Many auditors simply rely on submitting reports that indicate compliance or non-compliance with the appropriate section of the standard; however, to most executives, this is like speaking a foreign language. Auditors that can clearly identify and communicate areas for improvement in language and terms executive management understands facilitate action on improvement initiatives by the companies they audit. When management doesn't understand why they were non-compliant and the business implications associated with non-compliance, they simply ignore the reports and focus on what they do understand.

=== Advantages ===
Proper quality management can improve business, often having a positive effect on investment, market share, sales growth, sales margins, competitive advantage, and avoidance of litigation. The quality principles in ISO 9000:2000 are also sound, according to Wade and Barnes, who says that "ISO 9000 guidelines provide a comprehensive model for quality management systems that can make any company competitive". Sroufe and Curkovic, (2008) found benefits ranging from registration required to remain part of a supply base, better documentation, to cost benefits, and improved involvement and communication with management. According to the ISO, the 2015 version of the standard brings the following benefits:

1. By assessing their context, organizations can define who is affected by their work and what they expect. This enables clearly stated business objectives and the identification of new business opportunities.
2. Organizations can identify and address the risks associated with their organization.
3. By putting customers first, organizations can make sure they consistently meet customer needs and enhance customer satisfaction. This can lead to more repeat customers, new clients and increased business for the organization.
4. Organizations work in a more efficient way as all their processes are aligned and understood by everyone. This increases productivity and efficiency, bringing internal costs down.
5. Organizations will meet necessary statutory and regulatory requirements.
6. Organizations can expand into new markets, as some sectors and clients require ISO 9001 before doing business.

=== Criticisms of ISO 9001 certification ===
A common criticism of ISO 9000 and 9001 is the amount of money, time, and paperwork required for a complete implementation, and later, when needed, ISO 9001 certification. Dalgleish cites the "inordinate and often unnecessary paperwork burden" of ISO, and says that "quality managers feel that ISO's overhead and paperwork are excessive and extremely inefficient". The level of minimum documentation for a minimum scope organization has been greatly reduced, going from ISO 9001:2000 to ISO 9001:2008 to ISO 9001:2015.

According to Barnes:

"Opponents claim that it is only for documentation. Proponents believe that if a company has documented its quality systems, then most of the paperwork has already been completed."

Wilson suggests that ISO standards "elevate inspection of the correct procedures over broader aspects of quality", and therefore, "the workplace becomes oppressive and quality is not improved".

One study showing reasons for not adopting this standard include the risks and uncertainty of not knowing if there are direct relationships to improved quality, and what kind and how many resources will be needed. Additional risks include how much certification will cost, increased bureaucratic processes and risk of poor company image if the certification process fails. According to John Seddon, ISO 9001 promotes specification, control, and procedures rather than understanding and improvement.

Wade argues that ISO 9000 is effective as a guideline, but that promoting it as a standard "helps to mislead companies into thinking that certification means better quality, ... [undermining] the need for an organization to set its own quality standards". In short, Wade argues that reliance on the specifications of ISO 9001 does not guarantee a successful quality system.

The standard is seen as especially prone to failure when a company is interested in certification before quality. Certifications are in fact often based on customer contractual requirements rather than a desire to actually improve quality. ISO's Roger Frost suggested:

"If you just want the certificate on the wall, chances are you will create a paper system that doesn't have much to do with the way you actually run your business."

Certification by an independent auditor is often seen as the problem area, and according to Barnes, "has become a vehicle to increase consulting services".

Dalgleish argues: "...[while] quality has a positive effect on return on investment, market share, sales growth, better sales margins, and competitive advantage,...taking a quality approach is unrelated to ISO 9000 registration." In fact, ISO itself advises that ISO 9001 can be implemented without certification, simply for the quality benefits that can be achieved.

Abrahamson argues that fashionable management discourse such as quality circles tends to follow a lifecycle in the form of a bell curve, possibly indicating a management fad.

Dytz argues that ISO 9001 certification is based on 7 management principles and that companies are free to develop their internal tools and working methods, however, the model adopted to audit and certify companies does not evaluate the effectiveness of these methods. Even when there is still a superficial analysis of this effectiveness, mainly due to the time available to audit these companies, the certifications do not distinguish two companies with the same business model, with regard to their internal capacity and quality of management.

Pickrell argues that ISO systems merely gauge whether the processes are being followed. It does not gauge how good the processes are or whether the correct parameters are being measured and controlled to ensure quality. Furthermore, when unique technical solutions are involved in the creation of a new part, ISO does not validate the robustness of the technical solution—a key part of advanced quality planning. It is not unheard of for an ISO-certified plant to display poor quality performance due to poor process selection and/or poor technical solutions.

Lastly, the standard itself is proprietary, and not open to inspection by the general public.

=== Reasons for Loss of ISO 9000 Certification ===
ISO 9001 certification has a three-year validity period. At the end of this period, every certified organization must renew its certificate. Not all organizations are successful in their renewal. Some organizations are not able to renew the certificate, because they do not conform to all requirements, and others simply decide not to renew the certificate. There are several reasons why an organization may lose or decide not to renew its ISO 9000 certification:

- Some companies may think that the total cost outweighs the certification benefits. This is the most cited reason for voluntary decertification, but some research suggests that economic underperformance is not the reason why firms lose the certification.
- In some industries, there may be too many competitors already certified which may create the sensation that the potential for competitive advantage gained from (re)certification is lower.
- Some companies may believe that they have internalized the certification benefits into their processes and do not feel the need for formal certification as they can continue to conform to the ISO 9001 standard without formal registration within a certification body.
- Some of the customers may no longer demand certification.
- Some companies may have considered their ISO 9001 certification as a first step into quality management and now want to evolve their quality management systems by advancing to other alternative certifications (e.g., IATF 16949:2016, in the automobile industry) or toward other more demanding quality management systems (e.g., total quality management (TQM), Six Sigma, lean manufacturing).
- Financial distress.
- Expected performance after decertification.
- Improper ISO 9001 implementation.

=== Propensity for Loss of ISO 9000 Certification ===
According to the latest data made available by ISO, approximately 60,000 organizations lose the certification every year. Given that there are approximately 1,000,000 certified organizations worldwide, and that 1/3 of these (approx. 333,333) must renew the certificate every year, the yearly average propensity for ISO 9001 withdrawal can be estimated roughly at 18% (60,000/333,333). The propensity of a given organization to lose its certification can be estimated, depending on several factors specific to the organization:

- Initial certification motives
- Certification barriers overcome during certification
- Certification benefits achieved
- Decertification motives held
- Expected performance after decertification

== See also ==
- Quality management system – Sum of product fitness processes in a business
- ISO 8000 – International standard for Data Quality and Enterprise Master Data
- ISO/IEC 42001 – Artificial intelligence management system (shares High-Level Structure with ISO 9001)
