= Reporting Body Identifier =

First two digits of GSM Type Allocation Code

The Reporting Body Identifier is the first two digits of a Global System for Mobile Communications (GSM) Type Allocation Code, and indicates the GSMA-approved organization that registered (or, before 2002, approved) a given mobile device, and allocated the model a unique code.

The numbers are loosely based on the telephone country code (CC) of the organization identified, as most approving nations used a single approval body endorsed by their national GSM Association chapter. However, not all Reporting Body Identifiers follow this tendency.

== Reporting Body Identifier codes ==
According to Permanent Reference Document TS.06 (IMEI Allocation and Approval Process Version 25.0, 01 May 2024 ), Appendix A of the GSM Association, the current Reporting Body Identifier (RBI) codes indicate the following approval/allocation bodies:

Code	Group/indication	Origin
00	Test IMEI	Nations with 2-digit CCs
02-09	Test IMEI	Nations with 3-digit CCs
01	CTIA (PTCRB)	United States
35	TÜV SÜD (BABT)	United Kingdom
86	TAF Telecommunication Terminal Testing & Approval Forum	China
98	Reserved for Future Use Note: a few TAC codes had previously been assigned from this block 98000100 to 98007800
99	Global Hexadecimal Administrator (GHA)	For multi RAT 3GPP2/3GPP

Reporting Bodies that no Longer Allocate IMEIs:

Code	Group/indication	Origin
10	DECT devices
30	Iridium	United States (satellite phones)
33	DGPT	France
35	BABT	United Kingdom
44	BABT	United Kingdom
45	NTA	Denmark
49	BZT / BAPT	Germany
50	BZT ETS	Germany
51	Cetecom ICT	Germany
52	Cetecom	Germany
53	TÜV	Germany
54	Phoenix Test Lab	Germany
91	MSAI	India

== Reporting Body Identifier vs Regional Code ==
The "Reporting Body Identifier" is also known as the Regional Code in the CDMA context. The International Mobile Station Equipment Identity (IMEI) and Mobile Equipment Identifier (MEID) structures are superficially the same, except that the first two digits must be decimal for an IMEI, and must be hexadecimal for an MEID. In 3GPP2 terms the GSMA is the Global Decimal Administrator while the Telecommunications Industry Association (TIA) is the Global Hexadecimal Administrator.

== See also ==
- International Mobile Station Equipment Identity
- International mobile subscriber identity (IMSI)
- Mobile equipment identifier
