= Kaiho Sangyo =

Japanese automobile recycling company

Kaiho Sangyo Co., Ltd. 会宝産業株式会社
- Company type: Kabushiki kaisha
- Founded: May 1969
- Founder: Norihiko Kondo
- Headquarters: Kanazawa, Japan
- Key people: Takayuki Kondo (president); Norihiko Kondo (chairman)
- Products: used Japanese cars, motors, auto parts
- Website: kaihosangyo.jp

Kaiho Sangyo Co., Ltd. (会宝産業株式会社, Kaiho Sangyo Kabushiki-gaisha) is a Japanese automobile recycling company based in Kanazawa city, Ishikawa Prefecture, Japan.

== History ==
In 1969 Norihiko Kondo founded Kondo Automobile Company Inc. in Kanazawa City, Ishikawa Prefecture. His company originally specialized in dismantling automobiles and selling scrap steel, aluminium and copper.

The turning point for the business came in 1991 when he sold 20 tons of used engines and suspension parts to a customer from Kuwait. In 1992, Kondo renamed his company Kaiho Sangyo and shifted his business from a simple car-scrapping company to a recycling reseller of used automobile parts in foreign countries.

Revenue grew rapidly from 715 million yen in 2003 to 2.1 billion yen in 2008. Kaiho decided to invest in environmental management systems and product quality management systems in the early 2000s. Japan's Ministry of Economy, Trade and Industry awarded the IT Management Award for Small and Medium Enterprises to Kaiho in 2008.

Kaiho Sangyo was the largest exporter of used automobile parts in Japan in 2010.

Kaiho's operating capacity in 2011 was 1200 vehicles per month, and it exported more than 20,000 engines annually to 74 countries with joint ventures in Thailand, Kenya, Nigeria, Ghana, and Singapore.

Kaiho Sangyo founded the Re-Use Motorization Alliance (RUM Alliance) in April 2003 and the International Recycling Education Center (IREC) in April 2007. The company developed a standard for rating the quality of used engines for export, called the Japan Reuse Standard (JRS). The JRS uses a five-level assessment for six items including compression, overheating and mileage.

In February 2013, Kaiho Sangyo submitted its own technical specification of JRS to the British Standard Institute (BSI), which was issued as the Publicly Available Specification PAS777 in October of the same year.

Since April 2015, the company is led by Takayuki Kondo, son of Norihiko Kondo.

The company was creating a vehicle recycling plant in Minas Gerais (Brazil) in collaboration with the Federal Center of Technological Education of Minas Gerais (Cefet-MG) in 2014.

=== Timeline ===
- May 1969: Establishment of Kondo Automobile Company Inc.
- Feb 1992: Name change to Kaiho Sangyo Corporation
- Feb 2002: ISO14001 certification acquisition
- Feb 2003: Creation of NPO RUM Alliance
- Mar 2005: ISO9001 certification acquisition
- Jan 2006: Ishikawa Niche Top Industries certification
- Sep 2006: Awarded as Top 100 IT Management Enterprises in Japan
- Dec 2007: Capital increase from 24,000,000 yen to 57,000,000 yen
- Feb 2008: Awarded as Small and Medium IT Management Enterprises in Japan
- Jul 2008: Settlement of KAIHO THAILAND (Joint Venture in Thailand)
- Mar 2009: Awarded as one of the Top 300 Japan High Service Company
- Jun 2009: Settlement of MAEJI KAIHO (Joint Venture in Kenya)
- May 2010: Settlement of KAIHO SINGAPORE (Joint Venture in Singapore)
- Aug 2011: Settlement of KAIHO SANGYO CO. (NIG) (Joint Venture in Nigeria)
- Sep 2011: Settlement of KAIHO SANGYO CO., GHANA (Joint Venture in Ghana)
- Nov 2011: Awarded as the 3rd Ranked Alibaba Supplier in Japan
- Feb 2012: First JICA BoP business promotion research entrusted in Nigeria
- Nov 2013: Semifinalist in the 13th EY Entrepreneur of the year Japan
- Jun 2014: Awarded as an Outstanding Social Contributor – Best Companies Awards 2014, Funai Corporation’s Foundation
- Jul 2014: Foundation of the local subsidiary KAIHO MIDDLE EAST (FZE) in United Arab Emirates
