= PAS 79 =

PAS 79 (Fire risk assessment – Guidance and a recommended methodology) is a Publicly Available Specification published by the British Standards Institution.

This PAS gives guidance and corresponding examples of documentation for undertaking, and recording the significant findings of, fire risk assessments in buildings and parts of buildings for which fire risk assessments are required by legislation (more specifically the "Regulatory Reform (Fire Safety) Order 2005 in England and Wales, and the Scottish equivalent Fire (Scotland) Act 2005 in conjunction with the Fire Safety (Scotland) Regulations 2006).
