= Federal Office for Approvals in Telecommunications =

German federal agency

- Bundesamt für Zulassungen in der Telekommunikation

Agency overview
- Formed: 1982
- Jurisdiction: Germany
- Status: Defunct
- Headquarters: Saarbrücken
- Parent agency: Federal Ministry of Post and Telecommunications

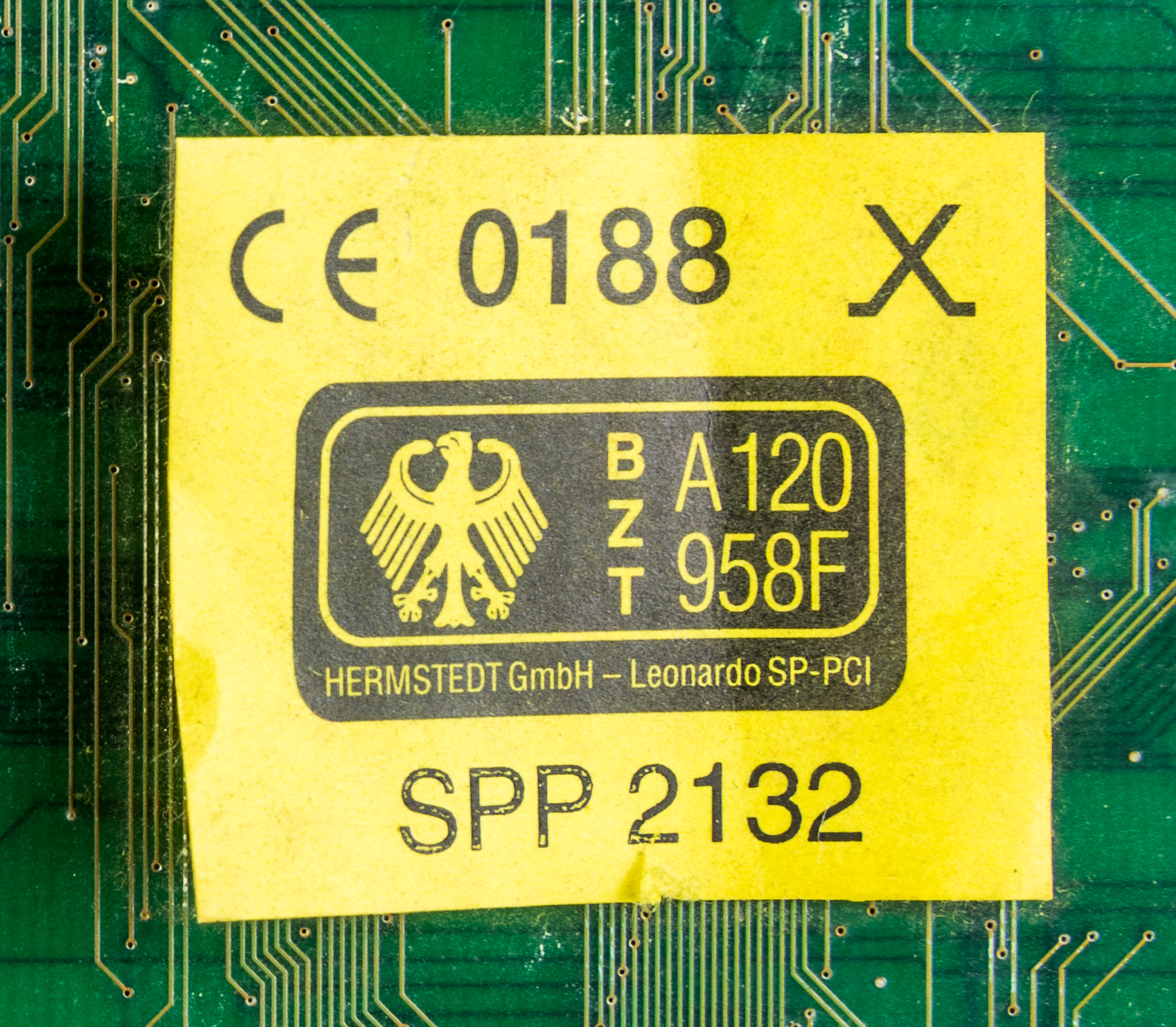
Approval sticker on an ISDN expansion card from Hermstedt.

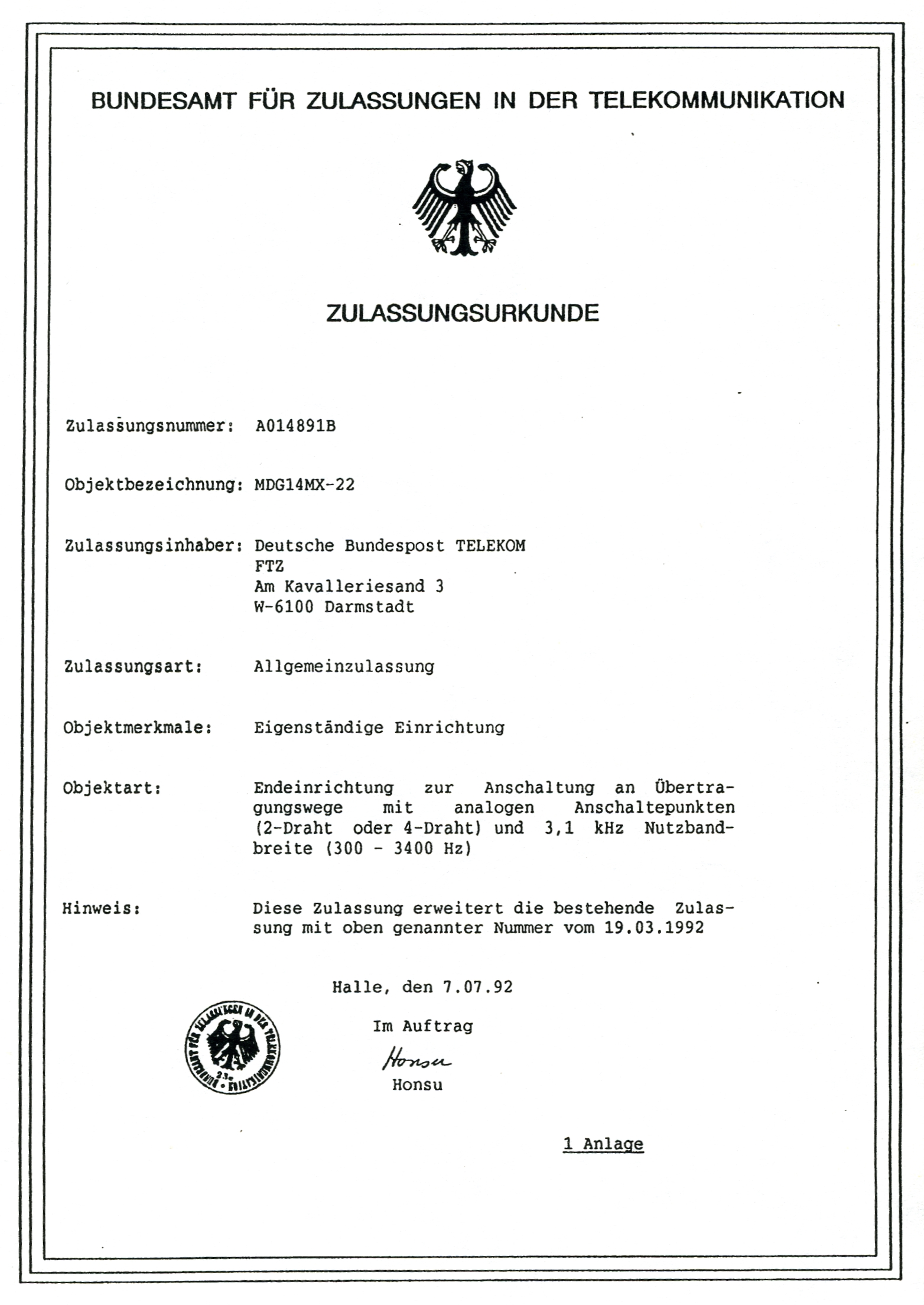
Example of an approval certificate from the BZT

The Federal Office for Approvals in Telecommunications (German: Bundesamt für Zulassungen in der Telekommunikation, BZT) was a federal agency in Germany responsible for approving telecommunication devices. It was seated in Saarbrücken.

== History ==
The origins of the BZT lie in the Central Office for Licensing in Telecommunications (German: Zentralamt für Zulassungen im Fernmeldewesen) (ZZF), founded in 1982, which took over the licensing tasks from the Central Telecommunications Technical Office in Darmstadt.[1] As part of the postal reform, the ZZF was separated from the then German Federal Post Office in 1989 and became an independent federal office, directly subordinate to the Federal Ministry of Posts and Telecommunications

On March 10, 1992, the ZZF was renamed BZT. In 1996, it was finally merged with the Federal Office for Post and Telecommunications in Mainz. After transferring a large part of the BAPT's regulatory tasks to the Regulatory Authority for Posts and Telecommunications, the licensing tasks were finally handed over to private accredited companies. The BZT's laboratory facilities in Saarbrücken were sold to Cetecom GmbH upon expiration of the official licensing at the beginning of 1998. On April 7, 2000, the national licensing requirement ended, and manufacturers were required to comply with EU Directive 1999/5/EC. Parts of these tasks were taken over by the Federal Network Agency, which still maintains an office in Saarbrücken.

== Criticism ==
Because cheap modems from the United States were banned, the Chaos Computer Club published schematics of modems. The Datenklo modem became well known.

== See also ==
- British Approvals Board for Telecommunications
