= PAS 777 =

Specification regarding engines

PAS 777:2013 is a Publicly Available Specification published by the British Standards Institution in October 2013 entitled “Specification for the qualification and labelling of used automotive engines and any related transmission units”.

The PAS777 uses a five-level assessment for six items of a used engine including compression, overheating, mileage, internal and external status.

PAS 777 was sponsored by Sun Partners Company Limited and Kaiho sangyo Corporate.

- PAS 777:2013, ISBN 978 0 580 81161 6
