= The Filipino Channel =

Filipino international TV channel

- Logo used since 2011
- Country: Philippines; International
- Broadcast area: Worldwide
- Network: ABS-CBN
- Headquarters: ABS-CBN Broadcasting Center, Diliman, Quezon City, Philippines (Philippine headquarters); ABS-CBN International, 2001 Junipero Serra Blvd, Suite 200, Daly City, California, 94014, United States (International headquarters)

Programming
- Languages: Filipino; English
- Picture format: 720p/1080i HDTV (downscaled to 480i/576i for the SD feed)

Ownership
- Owner: ABS-CBN Corporation
- Parent: ABS-CBN International
- Sister channels: ABS-CBN News Channel; Cinema One; Cine Mo! Jeepney TV; Kapamilya Channel; Knowledge Channel; Metro Channel; Myx; Myx (US); DZMM TeleRadyo

History
- Launched: September 24, 1994; 31 years ago

Links
- Website: mytfc.com (main website)

Availability

Terrestrial
- Zuku TV (Kenya): Channel 145
- StarHub TV (Singapore): Channel 144 (HD)
- SingTel TV (Singapore): Channel 693

ABS-CBN International
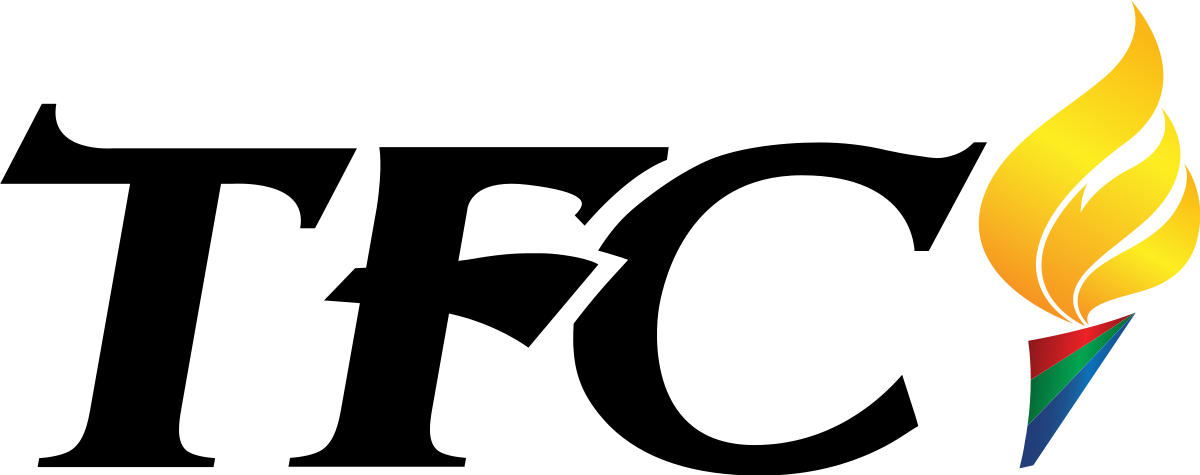
- Type: Division
- Industry: Broadcasting
- Founded: September 22, 1994; 31 years ago
- Headquarters: 2001 Junipero Serra Blvd, Suite 200, Daly City, California, U.S.
- Area served: Worldwide
- Key people: Carlo L. Katigbak (President and CEO, ABS-CBN Corporation); Mark Lopez (Chairman, ABS-CBN Corporation); Jun del Rosario (COO, ABS-CBN Global)
- Products: Television channels; Radio stations; Web portals
- Services: Television; Radio; Internet; Streaming service
- Owner: ABS-CBN Corporation
- Parent: ABS-CBN Global Ltd.

The Filipino Channel, commonly known as TFC, is a global subscription television network owned and operated by the Filipino media conglomerate ABS-CBN Corporation. Its programming is composed primarily of imported programs produced and distributed by ABS-CBN Studios and ABS-CBN News, targeting the Filipino diaspora. Available globally on various television platforms, TFC was launched on September 24, 1994, becoming the world's first trans-Pacific Asian broadcaster.

As of 2016, The Filipino Channel has over three million subscribers worldwide in over 40 countries across 4 continents, most of its subscribers are in United States, Canada, Middle East, Europe, Australia, Japan, Malaysia, Singapore, and Hong Kong.

== History ==
While TFC traces its origins to 1994, the idea of broadcasting television programming via satellite to the millions in the Filipino diaspora was already floated by the ABS-CBN Broadcasting Corporation (now ABS-CBN Corporation) in the late 1980s. This came just as it began reconstruction after forced closure under Martial Law and the 1986 People Power Revolution that ended the dictatorship of President Ferdinand Marcos, Sr. In 1989, the network began initial transmissions via satellite to Filipinos in the Northern Mariana Islands, especially in Saipan, as well as Guam, making it the first Philippine television network to do so.

Plans to launch the channel began in April 1994 when J. Xavier Gonzales, chief financial officer of Benpres Holdings, said that it would launch a cable television channel aimed at Filipinos living in the West Coast of the United States, rerunning Filipino shows, as well as older movies and made-for-TV films.

On September 24, 1994, ABS-CBN, through its newly established subsidiary ABS-CBN International, signed a historic deal with the PanAmSat to bring the first trans-Pacific Asian programming service to some two million Filipino immigrants in the United States using the then-newly launched PAS 2 satellite. The following day, TFC was officially launched, first as a cable-only network for millions of Filipino Americans countrywide.

The first headquarters of TFC was a garage in Daly City, California, with only eight employees doing all the tasks from managing phones and computers. By 1995, TFC has grown to 25,000 subscribers in the United States. Airings of Mara Clara and other teleseryes began in 1997, with Esperanza and Mula Sa Puso (From the Heart) being the most popular shows.

The old logo of The Filipino Channel (2004-2009).

By 2004, TFC has grown to 250,000 subscribers in the United States. This growth led to the expansion of TFC to other countries and territories.

In 2005, ABS-CBN International signed an affiliation agreement with DirecTV, one of the leading DTH providers in the United States. Under the deal, DirecTV has the exclusive right to distribute the TFC package on its DTH platform. In return, DirecTV will pay license fees to ABS-CBN and to ABS-CBN International. Later that year, the now defunct and award-winning internet television service TFC Now! was launched. This was later replaced by TFC.tv video streaming website. In this year, ABS-CBN International acquired San Francisco International Gateway from Loral Space & Communications. SFIG is a telecommunications port company based in Richmond, California. SFIG provides satellite communications services through its 2.5 acre (1 hectare) facility consisting of 19 satellite dish antennas and 9 modular equipment buildings. ABS-CBN International received Federal Communications Commission licensing approval in April 2006. Also in this year, ABS-CBN International opened its state-of-the-art studio and office in Redwood City, California. In 2006, SFIG successfully handled the pay per view distribution to In Demand and DirecTV for the Manny Pacquiao vs. Oscar Larios super featherweight championship title fight. SFIG's customers include Discovery Communications, CBS, ESPN, Playboy among others. SFIG is a member of the World Teleport Association.

In 2007, ABS-CBN Global launched Myx (now Myx TV), the first and only television channel in the United States that is targeted to the Asian-American youth audience. As of 2011, TFC has over 2.47 million subscribers worldwide. In the same year, TFC changed their logo.

By 2015, The Filipino Channel already had three million subscribers worldwide mostly in United States, Middle East, Australia, New Zealand, Japan, South Korea, Taiwan, Hong Kong, Europe, Africa, Canada and Southeast Asia (Thailand, Singapore, Malaysia, Indonesia).

In March 2012, ABS-CBN Global has chosen Etere to integrate its production facility for TFC. The ABS-CBN facility manages 24 channels with 3 different video servers in 3 different formats.(NLE).

On February 23, 2018, TFC IPTV and TFC Direct via cable and satellite subscribers had instant online access to TFC Online (now iWantTFC) with TFC Everywhere (TVE) feature.

In early February 2021, seven TFC channels went live with Amagi cloud platform to consolidate its play-out operations on the cloud to expand its reach and gain greater flexibility. Amagi is in SaaS for broadcast and streaming TV. ABS-CBN now manages end-to-end workflow on the cloud. Amagi clients include A+E Networks, beIN Sports, Discovery Networks, IMG and Warner Media, among others.

There are currently 7 different international feeds broadcasting to Europe, Middle East, Asia Pacific, Guam-Australia-New Zealand, USA East, USA West and Canada.

On September 1, 2020, TFC Online was merged with iWant to make the service accessible worldwide and was soft launched as iWantTFC.

On February 20, 2021, TFC migrated all of its international feeds into the high-definition format, ending with the EMEA feed, becoming the first Philippine-based cable network worldwide to be broadcast in HD.

On March 1, 2025, TFC has been launched to YouTube TV.

== Programming ==
The program line-up of The Filipino Channel is composed primarily of programs from ABS-CBN, a national television network in the Philippines. Programming ranging from news, public affairs, documentaries, public service, reality shows, soap operas, teleseryes, talk shows, sitcoms, gag shows, live events, and other formats and genres are shown on TFC in a slightly delayed basis and are synchronized automatically depending on the location of the broadcast. TFC also airs some programs produced abroad by ABS-CBN's foreign subsidiaries in United States, Asia-Pacific, Middle East, and Europe. These are generally not aired on ABS-CBN's main domestic channel but some are shown on ANC several hours or days after their original airing.

In 2007 the short lived Hero TV on TFC aired in April 2007-August 2007 and since 2019, most of iWant original programs and films are also aired on the channel, as well as on TFC IPTV and TFC Online (formerly ABS-CBN now).

TFC has been relatively unaffected by the ABS-CBN franchise renewal controversy which started May 6, 2020, after the network's legislative franchise to operate domestically over-the-air expired the day before, as it is not under the purview of the Philippine National Telecommunications Commission.

On February 1, 2021, The Filipino Channel relaunched its programming lineup with new shows and more viewing options with the classification of four blocks: Early Mornings, FUNanghalian, Teleserye Playback and Primetime Bida, similar to its Philippine-based counterpart.

== TFC Direct ==
In 1996, TFC Direct! was launched, an independently operated direct-to-home cable and satellite television service that incorporates the TV channels Sarimanok News Network (now ABS-CBN News Channel), Pinoy Blockbuster Channel (now Cinema One), Pinoy Central (later renamed as Kapamilya Channel, then it was replaced by Bro, and it was replaced again by now-defunct ABS-CBN Sports + Action (S+A)), and the radio channels DZMM Radyo Patrol 630 and WRR 101.9 For Life! (now MOR Entertainment).

=== Filipino On Demand ===
Filipino On Demand (FOD) is a video on demand service providing access to Filipino films, ABS-CBN classic shows and live concerts each month available on various cable providers in USA, Canada, Singapore and UAE.

== TFC IPTV ==
TFC IPTV
- Type: IPTV
- First air date: April 30, 2007; 19 years ago
- Broadcast area: Worldwide
- Owner: ABS-CBN Corporation
- Key people: Aldrin Cerrado (COO)
- Former names: TFCko
- Official website: TFC IPTV

Launched on April 30, 2007, TFC IPTV (formerly known as TFCko) is an IPTV and video on demand (VOD) service distributed around the world under the brand of The Filipino Channel. To avail of the service, users must acquire the TFC IPTV set-top box, connect the box to a TV set (HDMI for HDTVs, composite for SDTVs) and broadband internet through WiFi or Ethernet (requires 2 Mbit/s minimum speed), and subscribe to monthly subscription. The channel line up will depend on the subscription package availed and may include the live-streaming of TV channels The Filipino Channel, Myx TV, the international feeds of ANC, Cinema One, Cine Mo!, Jeepney TV, Kapamilya Channel, Knowledge Channel as well as radio channels DZMM TeleRadyo and MOR Entertainment, and an in-house interactive Karaoke channel. Aside from the live-streaming of ABS-CBN channels, the service also includes a video on demand feature that allow users to watch, pause, rewind, fast-forward select programs of the channels anytime for a period of one month and in high-definition format (for select programs and internet speed). The service also offers a wide selection of fresh movies from the Philippines and other pay per view contents like concerts and sporting events also in high-definition format. As of January 1, 2020, TFC IPTV has been discontinued sales in Canada and the United States of America but will still provide service to existing users of the IPTV services.

=== Channels ===
- TFC
- ANC Global
- Cine Mo! Global
- Cinema One Global
- Myx Global
- DZMM TeleRadyo
- Jeepney TV

=== Video on demand ===
- iWant Originals
- Jeepney TV
- Karaoke
- KBO Unlimited
- MOR Entertainment
- TFC PPV
- Viva

== Studio TFC ==
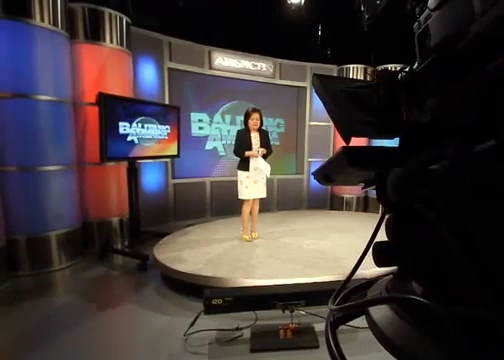
Ging Reyes, substituting for Gel Santos-Relos in Balitang America.

Adobo Nation, an original program taping from Studio TFC.

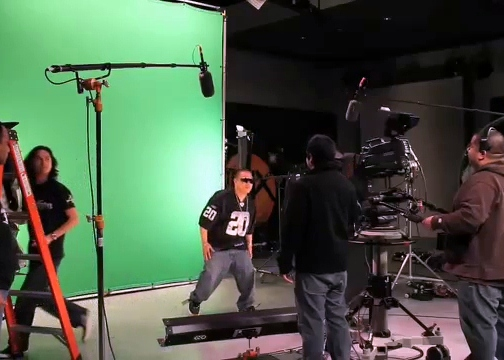
A show for Myx TV in Studio TFC.

== See also ==
- A2Z
- ABS-CBN
- All TV
- GMA Pinoy TV
- Kapamilya Channel
- Kapatid TV5 Channel
- RPN USA
- Overseas Filipino
- Immigration
