= BZT =

BZT may refer to:

- Benzethonium chloride, a synthetic ammonium salt commonly sold under the trade name BZT
- Brandon Zerk-Thatcher, an Australian rules footballer
- Federal Office for Approvals in Telecommunications (German: Bundesamt für Zulassungen in der Telekommunikation), Germany
