= PAS 2010 =

PAS 2010 is a Publicly Available Specification published by the British Standards Institution. It is particularly relevant to land use and spatial planning in terrestrial, coastal and freshwater environments, but its principles can also be applied to planning in the marine environment. It shows where and how competent authorities can have regards to seek to further biodiversity conversation in the exercise of their planning functions – as required under statutory obligations.

- PAS 2010:2006, ISBN 0-580-48844-6
