= PAS 78 =

PAS 78: Guide to good practice in commissioning accessible websites is a Publicly Available Specification published on March 8, 2006, by the British Standards Institution in collaboration with the Disability Rights Commission. It provides guidance to organisations in how to go about commissioning an accessible website from a design agency. It describes what is expected from websites to comply with the UK Disability Discrimination Act 1995, making websites accessible to disabled people.

== History ==
In December 2010, PAS 78 was superseded by the full British Standard that evolved from it: BS 8878:2010 Web accessibility Code of Practice.

BS 8878 continues PAS 78's emphasis on providing guidance to non-technical website owners for the whole process of commissioning, procuring, and producing accessible websites, updating it to handle:

- Web 2.0's much wider purposes for websites (e.g., multimedia sites, software as a service sites) and the move from provider-produced content to user-generated content (e.g., blogs, Facebook, YouTube)
- The increasing range of devices on which websites are viewed (e.g., smartphones, tablets, Internet Protocol television)
- The increasing use of non-W3C technologies to produce websites
- The increasing use of “off the shelf” website builder tools to create websites rather than bespoke development
- The increasing use of on-site accessibility personalisation tools like CSS style-switchers
- The changing organisational structure of web product teams and key personnel impacting product accessibility, especially the growing role of web product managers

== Audience ==
The principal audience is businesses within the UK, but it is a relevant document for charity and volunteer organisations, as well as local and central government. It is also a useful document for web design agencies and web developers as a guide to what is expected of them. It is written from a business perspective and describes the web standards and usability testing needed for producing accessible websites.

At the PAS 78 launch, the Disability Rights Commission's Legal Operations Director Nick O'Brien confirmed that PAS 78 would be used in supporting evidence in a court case against businesses that run inaccessible websites. Although the Disability Rights Commission has so far been conciliatory rather than litigious towards businesses running inaccessible websites, that approach could now change with the publication of PAS 78.

== Rationale ==
In April 2004 the Disability Rights Commission found that out of 1,000 UK websites, 81% failed to reach basic levels of web accessibility (Level A compliance to the W3C's Web Content Accessibility Guidelines). To alleviate the confusion within UK businesses regarding obligations under the Disability Discrimination Act 1995, one of the Disability Rights Commission's recommendations was to establish a best practice in how to commission websites that are accessible. PAS 78 is that set of best practice guidelines.

The Disability Discrimination Act was a significant reason commissioners began taking interest in user friendly and accessible websites. Making websites accessible also widens their target audience, and can allow them to reach a new one in the same beat.

The Family Resources survey revealed that there are nearly 10 million disabled individuals in the United Kingdom, all of whom have an investing power around 80 billion pounds per year. Furthermore, it found that there are millions of other individuals affected by sensory, bodily and/or intellectual impairments, including those caused by the ageing process.

Research carried out by the Disability Rights Commission “The Web : Access and inclusion with regards to disabled people” confirmed that individuals without any afflictions are also able to make use of websites which are optimized to accessibility.

Content developed with the World Wide Web Consortium (W3C) guidelines and specifications in mind could be easily used in other mediums such as television, cell phones, portable computers, and on the internet.

Search engines also prefer to rank accessible content material higher when the equivalent is presented in graphical components.

Ensuring website accessibility may lead to better promotion, as interpersonal inclusion leads to opportunities and equality.

Additional business advantages achieved by developing accessible websites available are given on W3C.

== Contents ==
PAS 78 covers the general principles of building an accessible website, and discusses how disabled people use computers and websites. The heart of the document covers Web technologies (HTML, CSS, JavaScript) and rich media format (such as PDF, Flash, audio and video). The section on testing covers the technical testing, (page validation) user testing, and user testing with disabled people. The last section covers contracting external companies, focusing on choosing a website developer.

The supplementary documentation contains a number of resources, including suggested user profiles for building up test cases, success criteria, suggested questions for web design agencies, available accreditation schemes, how to select a content management system, and a collection of references, such as organisations and books about web accessibility.

== Comparison with Section 508 ==
Section 508 is part of the US Rehabilitation Act, which required Federal Agencies to make their electronic and information technology accessible to people with disabilities. It does this by setting out required checkpoints for website accessibility. This is much like the W3C's Web Content Accessibility Guidelines version 1.0.

PAS 78 is an umbrella document, meaning it does not define any new guidelines or standards, and instead acts as a summary document describing the use of existing web standards and technologies. It currently references the W3C's Web Content Accessibility Guidelines, and promotes the use of structured markup, avoiding presentational attributes, and advises the use of CSS layouts. In essence, PAS 78 advocates the use of existing web standards.

Their approach to PDF and Flash is that it should be used when it is the most appropriate format for delivering content, and that when it benefits the end user, not the authors.
