= BS 5993 =

BS 5993 is a British Standard specifying the construction details, dimensions, quality and performance of cricket balls.

BS 5993:1994 Specification for cricket balls was published on 15 January 2005 and confirmed on 1 October 2012. It replaces BS 5993:1987.
