= British Standards =

Standards produced by BSI Group

BSI Kitemark certification symbol

British Standards (BS) are the standards produced by the BSI Group which is incorporated under a royal charter and that is formally designated as the national standards body (NSB) for the UK. The BSI Group produces British Standards under the authority of the charter, with one of their objectives being to:

Set up standards of quality for goods and services, and prepare and promote the general adoption of British Standards and schedules in connection therewith and from time to time to revise, alter and amend such standards and schedules as experience and circumstances require.

— BSI Royal Charter, Faller and Graham

Formally, as stated in a 2002 memorandum of understanding between the BSI and the United Kingdom Government, British Standards are defined as:

"British Standards" means formal consensus standards as set out in BS 0-1 paragraph 3.2 and based upon the principles of standardisation recognised inter alia in European standardisation policy.

— Memorandum of Understanding Between the United Kingdom Government and the British Standards Institution in Respect of its Activities as the United Kingdom's National Standards Body, United Kingdom Department for Business, Innovation, and Skills

Products and services which BSI certifies as having met the requirements of specific standards within designated schemes are awarded the Kitemark.

== History ==
Sir John Wolfe Barry, the leader of the Institution of Civil Engineers in 1896, helped to develop standards for iron and steel production, the forerunner of the BSI.

The BSI Group began in 1901 as the Engineering Standards Committee, led by James Mansergh, to standardize the number and type of steel sections, in order to make British manufacturers more efficient and competitive. The committee met for the first time on 22 January 1901.

The UK government recognised BSI as the only organisation for issuing standards in Britain, in 1942. In 1955, the government introduced new regulations for Kitemarks on car seat belts and cycling helmets, coinciding with a BSI Kitemark test centre opening in Hemel Hempstead. By the 1970s BSI was focusing on management quality systems.

Over time the standards developed to cover many aspects of tangible engineering, and then engineering methodologies including quality systems, safety and security.

== Creation ==
The BSI Group as a whole does not produce British Standards, as standards work within the BSI is decentralized. The governing board of BSI establishes a Standards Board. The Standards Board does little apart from setting up sector boards (a sector in BSI parlance being a field of standardization such as ICT, quality, agriculture, manufacturing, or fire). Each sector board, in turn, constitutes several technical committees. It is the technical committees that formally approve a British Standard, which is then presented to the secretary of the supervisory sector board for endorsement of the fact that the technical committee has indeed completed a task for which it was constituted.

== Standards ==
The standards produced are titled British Standard XXXX[-P]:YYYY where XXXX is the number of the standard, P is the number of the part of the standard (where the standard is split into multiple parts) and YYYY is the year in which the standard came into effect. BSI Group currently has over 27,000 active standards. Products are commonly specified as meeting a particular British Standard, and in general, this can be done without any certification or independent testing. The standard simply provides a shorthand way of claiming that certain specifications are met, while encouraging manufacturers to adhere to a common method for such a specification.

The Kitemark can be used to indicate certification by BSI, but only where a Kitemark scheme has been set up around a particular standard. It is mainly applicable to safety and quality management standards. There is a common misunderstanding that Kitemarks are necessary to prove compliance with any BS standard, but in general, it is neither desirable nor possible that every standard be 'policed' in this way.

Following the move on harmonization of the standard in Europe, some British Standards are gradually being superseded or replaced by the relevant European Standards (EN).

== Status of standards ==
Standards are continuously reviewed and developed and are periodically allocated one or more of the following status keywords.

- Confirmed - the standard has been reviewed and confirmed as being current.
- Current - the document is the current, most recently published one available.
- Draft for public comment/DPC - a national stage in the development of a standard, where wider consultation is sought within the UK.
- Obsolescent - indicating by amendment that the standard is not recommended for use for new equipment, but needs to be retained to provide for the servicing of equipment that is expected to have a long working life, or due to legislative issues.
- Partially replaced - the standard has been partially replaced by one or more other standards.
- Proposed for confirmation - the standard is being reviewed and it has been proposed that it is confirmed as the current standard.
- Proposed for obsolescence - the standard is being reviewed and it has been proposed that it is made obsolescent.
- Proposed for withdrawal - the standard is being reviewed and it has been proposed that it is withdrawn.
- Revised - the standard has been revised.
- Superseded - the standard has been replaced by one or more other standards.
- Under review - the standard is under review.
- Withdrawn - the document is no longer current and has been withdrawn.
- Work in hand - there is work being undertaken on the standard and there may be a related draft for public comment available.

== Examples ==
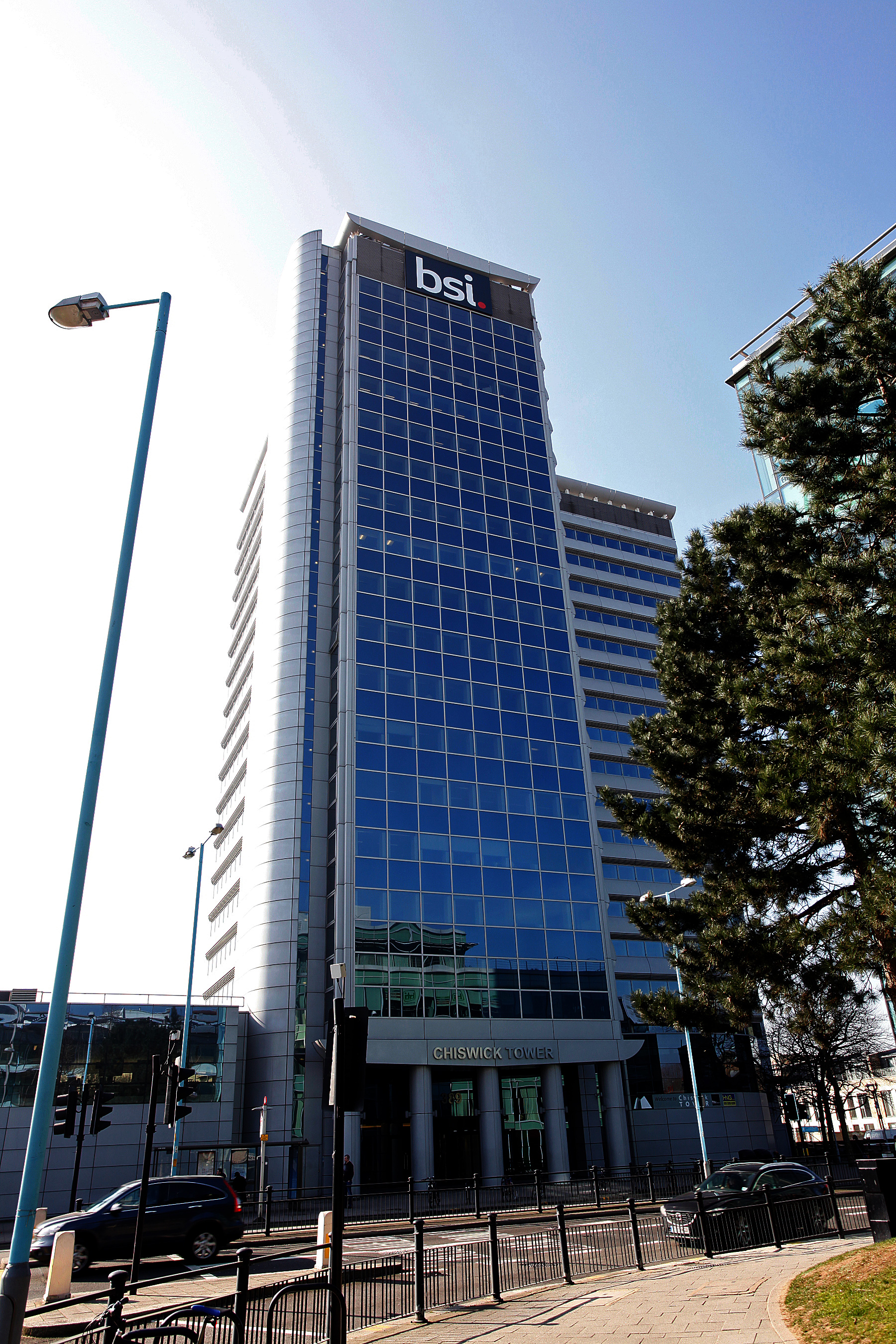
BSI Group headquarters in Chiswick, London.

- BS 0 A standard for standards specifies development, structure and drafting of standards.
- BS 857 for safety glass for land transport
- BS 1088 for marine plywood
- BS 1192 for Construction Drawing Practice. Part 5 (BS1192-5:1998) concerns Guide for structuring and exchange of CAD data.
- BS 5400 for steel, concrete and composite bridges.
- BS 5993 for cricket balls
- BS 6312 for telephone plugs and sockets

== PAS documents ==
BSI also publishes a series of Publicly Available Specification (PAS) documents.

PAS documents are a flexible and rapid standards development model open to all organizations. A PAS is a sponsored piece of work allowing organizations flexibility in the rapid creation of a standard while also allowing for a greater degree of control over the document's development. A typical development time frame for a PAS is around six to nine months. Once published by BSI, a PAS has all the functionality of a British Standard for the purposes of creating schemes such as management systems and product benchmarks as well as codes of practice. A PAS is a living document and after two years the document will be reviewed and a decision made with the client as to whether or not this should be taken forward to become a formal standard. The term PAS was originally an abbreviation for "product approval specification", a name which was subsequently changed to "publicly available specification". However, according to BSI, not all PAS documents are structured as specifications and the term is now sufficiently well established not to require any further amplification.

=== Examples ===
- PAS 78: Guide to good practice in commissioning accessible websites
- PAS 440: Responsible Innovation – Guide
- PAS 9017: Plastics – Biodegradation of polyolefins in an open-air terrestrial environment – Specification
- PAS 1881: Assuring safety for automated vehicle trials and testing – Specification
- PAS 1201: Guide for describing graphene material
- PAS 4444: Hydrogen fired gas appliances – Guide

== Availability ==
Copies of British Standards are sold at the BSI Online Shop or can be accessed via subscription to British Standards Online (BSOL). They can also be ordered via the publishing units of many other national standards bodies (ANSI, DIN, etc.) and from several specialized suppliers of technical specifications.

British Standards, including European and international adoptions, are available in many university and public libraries that subscribe to the BSOL platform. Librarians and lecturers at UK-based subscribing universities have full access rights to the collection while students can copy/paste and print but not download a standard. Up to 10% of the content of a standard can be copy/pasted for personal or internal use and up to 5% of the collection made available as a paper or electronic reference collection at the subscribing university. Because of their reference material status standards are not available for interlibrary loan. Public library users in the UK may have access to BSOL on a view-only basis if their library service subscribes to the BSOL platform. Users may also be able to access the collection remotely if they have a valid library card and the library offers secure access to its resources.

The BSI Knowledge Centre in Chiswick, London can be contacted directly about viewing standards in their Members' Reading Room.

== See also ==
- Institute for Reference Materials and Measurements (EU)
