= British Approvals Board for Telecommunications =

Telecommunications certification organization

- Abbreviation: BABT
- Formation: July 1982
- Legal status: Non-profit company
- Purpose: Telephone in the UK
- Location: Hersham Place Technology Park, Molesey Road, Hersham, Walton-on-Thames, Surrey, KT12 4RZ, UK
- Region served: UK
- Parent organization: TÜV SÜD
- Website: babt.com

The British Approvals Board for Telecommunications (BABT) is a telecommunications certification body.

== History ==
=== State monopoly ===
It was established in July 1982 by the UK government to provide type approval services to the telecommunications terminal industry. At that point in history, British Telecom was a state monopoly, and even by 1982 BT only allowed (via approval) the four British manufacturers (STC, GEC, Plessey, and the "Thorn-Ericsson" partnership) to supply its twenty five types of phone through them, and not independently. However around 200,000 unapproved, independently bought phones were being used on the network. Loyalty to BT was of importance (commercially sensitive) to STC, Plessey and GEC as equipment for BT's exchanges was made exclusively by them.

In the same year, BT was becoming more commercially minded, opening up around one hundred new BT Phone Shops having become separated from the GPO through the British Telecommunications Act 1981 which also created the BABT. In 1982 there was a step-change in types of BT phones entering the market, and technology used for connecting phones, and the BABT was needed with a greater variety of phones than was previously available: BT was about to lose its monopoly on supplying phones.

=== Mechanism of approval ===

From July 1982, manufacturers could submit phones to be approved by BABT for a cost of £1,700, and would either carry the green circular label if approved, or a red triangular label if not (right). The main four British suppliers of telephones were very wary about supplying to non-BT independent retailers. At the same time BT was introducing its so-called IXT phones (IneXpensive Telephone), designed for the new plug-and-socket connections - another innovation. Philips TMC (formerly the Telephone Manufacturing Company) also made the new (more electronic) IXT phones. The British telephone sockets were introduced on 19 November 1981. On 19 July 1982, the government announced its desire to privatise BT, which happened in late 1984. By 1982, 15 million British homes had a phone, with 5 out of 6 only having one phone. Adding an extra phone without the new sockets was heavy work.

In the 1980s, it shared offices with the BEAB in Hersham, Surrey. The Telecommunications Act 1984 detailed standards for modems, which had to conform to BABT standards.

Since its incarnation, BABT has established itself as a Notified Body in Europe and has a number of appointments such as the IMEI allocation authority for GSM terminals under appointment from the GSM Association. In May 1992 it gave its first GSM approval to Orbitel.

== Structure ==
BABT is wholly owned by TÜV SÜD Product Service, Germany's leading testing and certification body.

== Function ==
BABT is a Notified Body for the following European Directives: 98/13/EC TTE & SESE Directive (now superseded by the R&TTE Directive); 89/336/EEC EMC Directive; 73/23/EEC Low Voltage Directive; 1999/5/EC R&TTE Directive. BABT is a Competent Body for the following Directives: 89/336/EEC EMC Directive

== See also ==
- Telecommunications Industry Association
- Type Allocation Code (TAC) for IMEI
