= British Electrotechnical Approvals Board =

Electrical safety and certification organisation

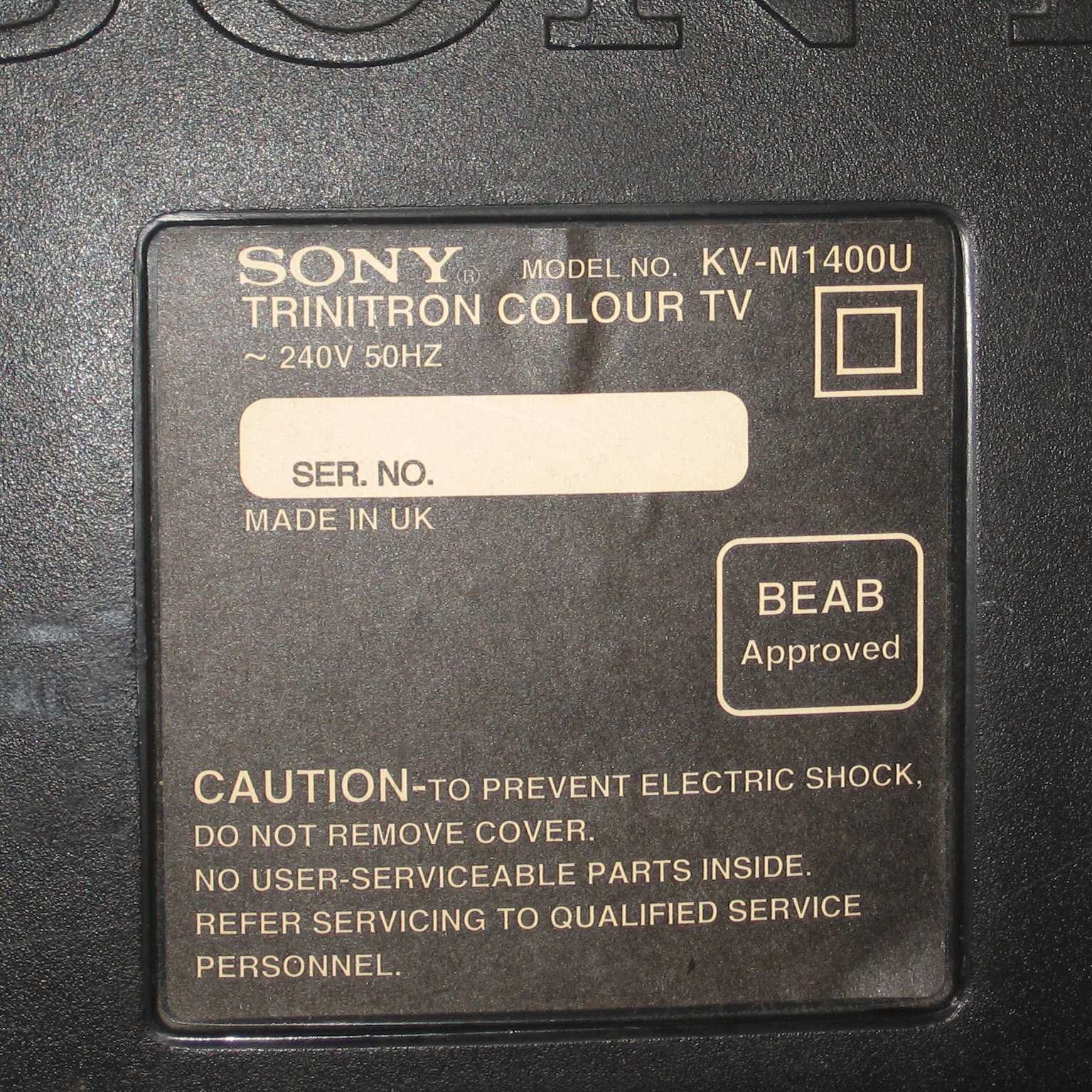
- Rear label of a 1990s Sony television indicating "BEAB Approved"
- Abbreviation: BEAB
- Formation: 1961
- Legal status: Non-profit company
- Purpose: Electrical safety in the UK
- Location: Surrey, UK
- Region served: UK
- Parent organization: Intertek
- Affiliations: European Committee for Electrotechnical Standardization (CENELEC)

The British Electrotechnical Approvals Board (BEAB) was an electrical safety and certification organisation in the UK, until the introduction of Harmonised European Standards meant that local certification of electrical products was no longer permitted. The BEAB Mark is now owned by Intertek Group.

== History ==
The British Electrotechnical Approvals Board (BEAB) was formed in 1960 by Regional Electricity Companies, manufacturers and retailer as the British Electrical Approvals Board for Domestic Appliances. It was based on Cockspur Street in London and operated test facilities at a laboratory owned by the British Electrical Development Association in Leatherhead; this later became the Appliance Testing Laboratories of the Electricity Council. In 1961 its headquarters moved to London Road, Kingston upon Thames. In 1974 it moved to The Green, Hersham near Walton-on-Thames in Surrey. In 1962 it extended the range of appliances it tested.

=== Name change ===
In 1971 it changed its name to the British Electrotechnical Approvals Board for Household Equipment. They joined forces with the British Approvals Board for Telecommunications. The headquarters moved to Station View in Guildford.

=== Merger ===
In 2004 it merged with ASTA Certification Services to form ASTA BEAB Certification Services. In June 2007, this company was acquired by Intertek. The testing is done in Leatherhead. Intertek was formed from ITS Testing & Certification Ltd, which became Intertek in September 2003.

== Function ==
Domestic electrical appliances with the BEAB Mark of Approval meant that they had reached a required safety standard (BS 3456).

=== BEAB Approved Mark ===
This mark means the item has been tested and deemed to be safe - it is a safety guarantee. That does not mean the item will always be safe (product quality may vary, and wear and tear will affect inherent safety), but the standard product should be. Electrical equipment is important to be safe because apart from the obvious danger of causing electric shocks, faulty electrical equipment such as electric blankets can cause fires.

Where fires have been caused by domestic electrical appliances, they are examined at the laboratory to determine what caused the fire.
