= Hermstedt =

German computer networking equipment manufacturer

Hermstedt AG
- Industry: Networking hardware
- Founded: 1987
- Defunct: 2007
- Fate: Acquired by Pro2col Ltd
- Headquarters: Mannheim
- Website: hermstedt.com at the Wayback Machine (archived 2003-07-04)

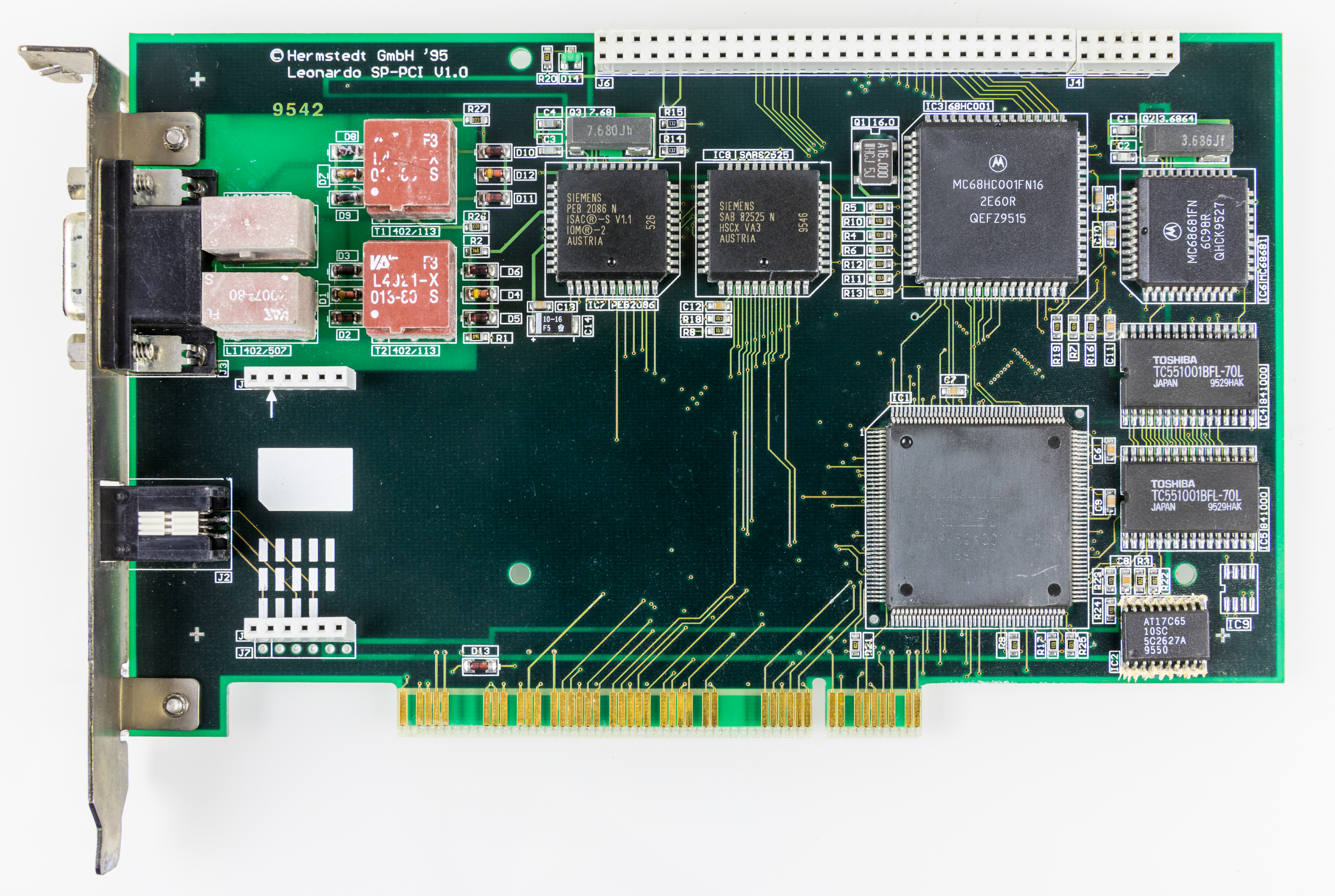
Hermstedt Leonardo SP-PCI-7982, an ISDN expansion card for PCI

Hermstedt AG was a German company primarily known for manufacturing ISDN hardware, including ISDN expansion cards. The company was founded in 1987.

In 2005, Hermstedt released the Hifidelio, a home music center.

Hermstedt was declared bankrupt in 2007. Pro2col Ltd acquired the file transfer division of Hermstedt in 2007.
