= Publicly Available Specification =

Standardization document

A Publicly Available Specification (PAS) is a standardization document that closely resembles a formal standard in structure and format but which has a different development model. The objective of a Publicly Available Specification is to speed up standardization. PASs are often produced in response to an urgent market need.

== Background ==
BSI Group develops PASs in the UK, while the International Electrotechnical Commission develops international PASs in the arena of electrical, electronic and related technologies, and the International Organization for Standardization develops international ISO PASs.

BSI Group pioneered the PAS format. Under the BSI model, any organization, association or group who wish to document standardized best practice on a specific subject can commission a PAS, subject to the BSI acceptance process. A British Standard and a PAS must reach full consensus between all stakeholders on technical content. The timescale for the development of a PAS can be shorter, typically around 8 months, and is why it is sometimes referred to as a 'fast-track standard'.

The development of a PAS cannot conflict with, or contradict, existing or draft work within the formal standards arena and must complement, not conflict with, any legislation in the subject area. It is also written in accordance with BS drafting rules, which means that the content must be technically robust and cannot be technically constrained (i.e. it cannot include patented or proprietary methods or products). It is written unambiguously and with objectively verifiable requirements or recommendations.

== Origin of term "PAS" ==

According to a BSI document "Principles of PAS standardization" "The term PAS was originally an acronym derived from "publicly available specification". However, not all PAS documents are structured as specifications and the term is now sufficiently well established not to require any further amplification." However, early examples of PAS were actually titled "Product Approval Specification" as illustrated in the accompanying photograph showing part of PAS 003, and may not be equivalent to PAS standards as they are used today.

== List of specifications ==
This list is not complete.

- PAS 13:2017: Code of practice for safety barriers used in traffic management within workplace environments with test methods for safety barrier impact resilience
- PAS 55: Asset Management
- PAS 56: Business Continuity Management System (2003)
- PAS 68: Impact resistant bollards for defence against hostile vehicles.
- PAS 72: Responsible Fishing - Specification of good practice for fishing vessels
- PAS 77: IT Service continuity management code of practice
- PAS 78: Guide to good practice in commissioning accessible websites
- PAS 79: Fire risk assessment – Guidance and a recommended methodology
- PAS 82: Shopfitting and interior contracting. Management system specification
- PAS 91: a standardised pre-qualification questionnaire (PQQ) for the construction industry.
- PAS 99: Specification of common management system requirements as a framework for integration
- PAS 100: Composting specification
- PAS 101: Specification for recovered container glass
- PAS 102: Specification for processed glass for selected secondary end markets
- PAS 103: Collected waste plastics packaging
- PAS 104: Wood recycling in the panelboard manufacturing industry
- PAS 105: Recovered paper sourcing and quality. Code of practice
- PAS 110: Producing Quality Anaerobic Digestate
- PAS 555:2013: Cyber security risk. Governance and management. Specification
- PAS 754:2014: Software Trustworthiness – Governance and management – Specification
- PAS 777:2013: Specification for the qualification and labelling of used automotive engines and any related transmission units (2013)
- PAS 911: Fire strategies - guidance and framework for their formulation
- PAS 1192: A series of specifications for building information modelling (BIM).
  - PAS 1192-2:2013: Specification for information management for the capital/delivery phase of construction projects using building information modelling
- PAS 1296:2018: Online age checking. Provision and use of online age check services. Code of Practice
- PAS 2010: Planning to halt the loss of biodiversity - Code of Practice
- PAS 2030: Installation of energy efficiency measures in existing dwellings – Specification
- PAS 2035: Retrofitting dwellings for improved energy efficiency – Specification and guidance
- PAS 2060: Specification for the demonstration of carbon neutrality
- PAS 2080: Carbon management in buildings and infrastructure
- PAS 3000:2015: Smart working - Code of Practice
- PAS 7050:2022 Bringing Safe Products to the Market - Code of Practice
- PAS 7055:2021 Button and coin batteries – Safety requirements
- PAS 7100:2022 Product Recall and Other Corrective Actions - Code of Practice
- PAS 9980: a code of practice for appraising the fire risk of external wall construction and cladding on existing blocks of flats.
- PAS 24000:2022 Social management system – Specification

== See also ==
- Guideline
- Specification (technical standard)
