= BSI Group =

British standards organization

The British Standards Institution
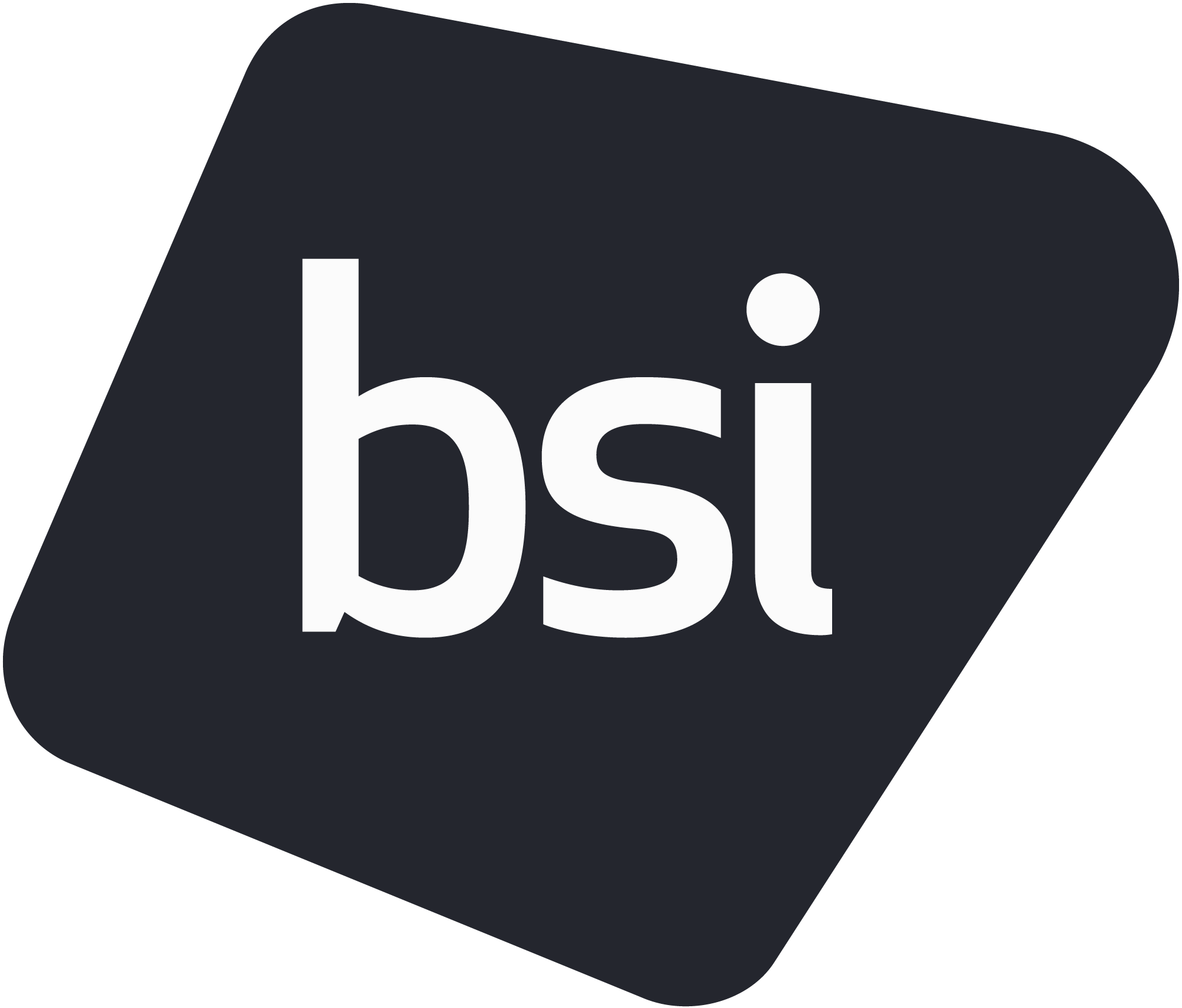
- Type: Non-profit distributing incorporated body operating under Royal Charter
- Founded: 1901
- Headquarters: London, United Kingdom
- Number of locations: 190+ countries
- Area served: Worldwide
- Key people: Susan Taylor Martin, CEO
- Products: standards and standards related services
- Revenue: £539.3m (2020)
- Number of employees: 9,200 (2025)
- Website: www.bsigroup.com

The British Standards Institution (BSI) is the national standards body of the United Kingdom. BSI produces technical standards on a wide range of products and services and also supplies standards certification services for business and personnel.

== History ==
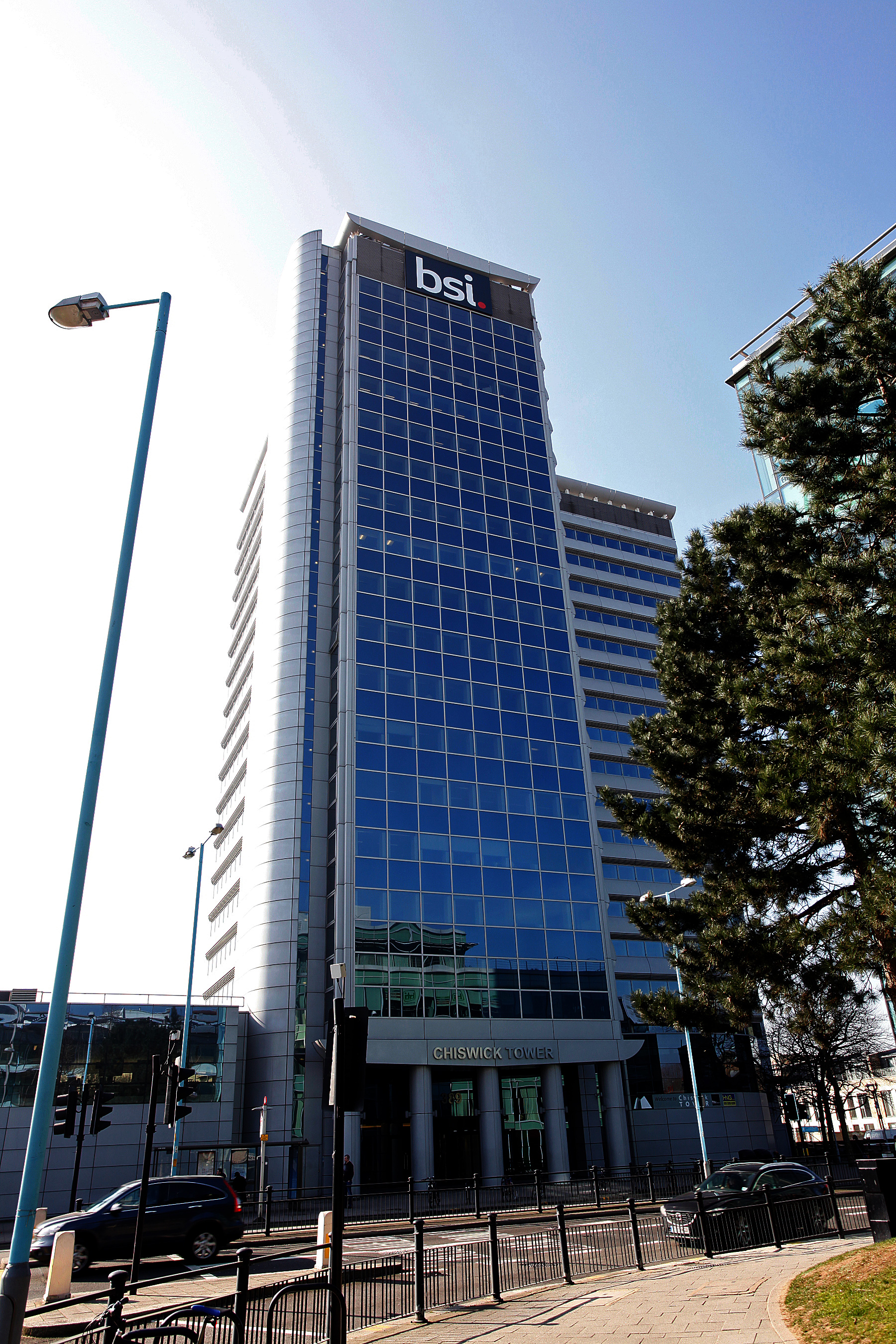
BSI Group's previous headquarters building in Gunnersbury, West London, featuring the BSI Group logo

BSI was founded as the Engineering Standards Committee in London in 1901. It subsequently extended its standardization work and became the British Engineering Standards Association in 1918, adopting the name British Standards Institution in 1931 after receiving a Royal Charter in 1929. In 1998, a revision of the Charter enabled the organization to diversify and acquire other businesses, and the trading name was changed to BSI Group.

The Group now operates in 195 countries. The core business remains standards and standards related services, although the majority of the Group's revenue comes from management systems assessment and certification work.

In 2021, BSI appointed its first female chief executive officer, Susan Taylor Martin.

== Activities ==
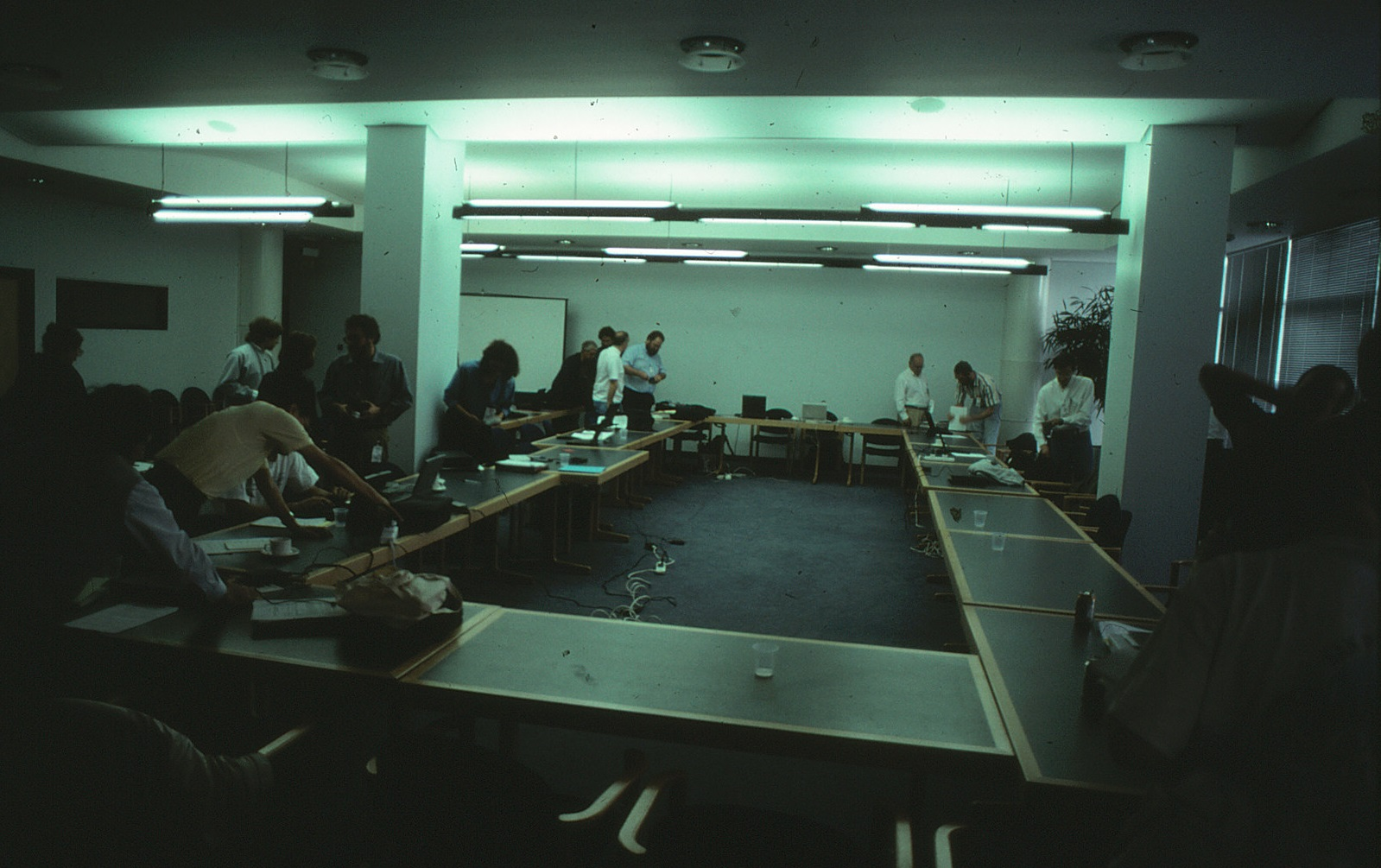
Meeting of the international standards committee for the C++ programming language, hosted at the British Standards Institution in 1997

BSI produces British Standards, and, as the UK's National Standards Body, is also responsible for the UK publication, in English, of international and European standards. BSI is obliged to adopt and publish all European Standards as identical British Standards (prefixed BS EN) and to withdraw pre-existing British Standards that are in conflict. However, it has the option to adopt and publish international standards (prefixed BS ISO or BS IEC).

In response to commercial demands, BSI also produces commissioned standards products such as Publicly Available Specifications (PASs), Private Standards and Business Information Publications. These products are commissioned by individual organizations and trade associations to meet their needs for standardized specifications, guidelines, codes of practice etc. Because they are not subject to the same consultation and consensus requirements as formal standards, the lead time is shorter.

BSI also publishes standards-related books, CD-ROMs, subscription and web-based products as well as providing training on standards-related issues.

== Management systems assessment and certification ==
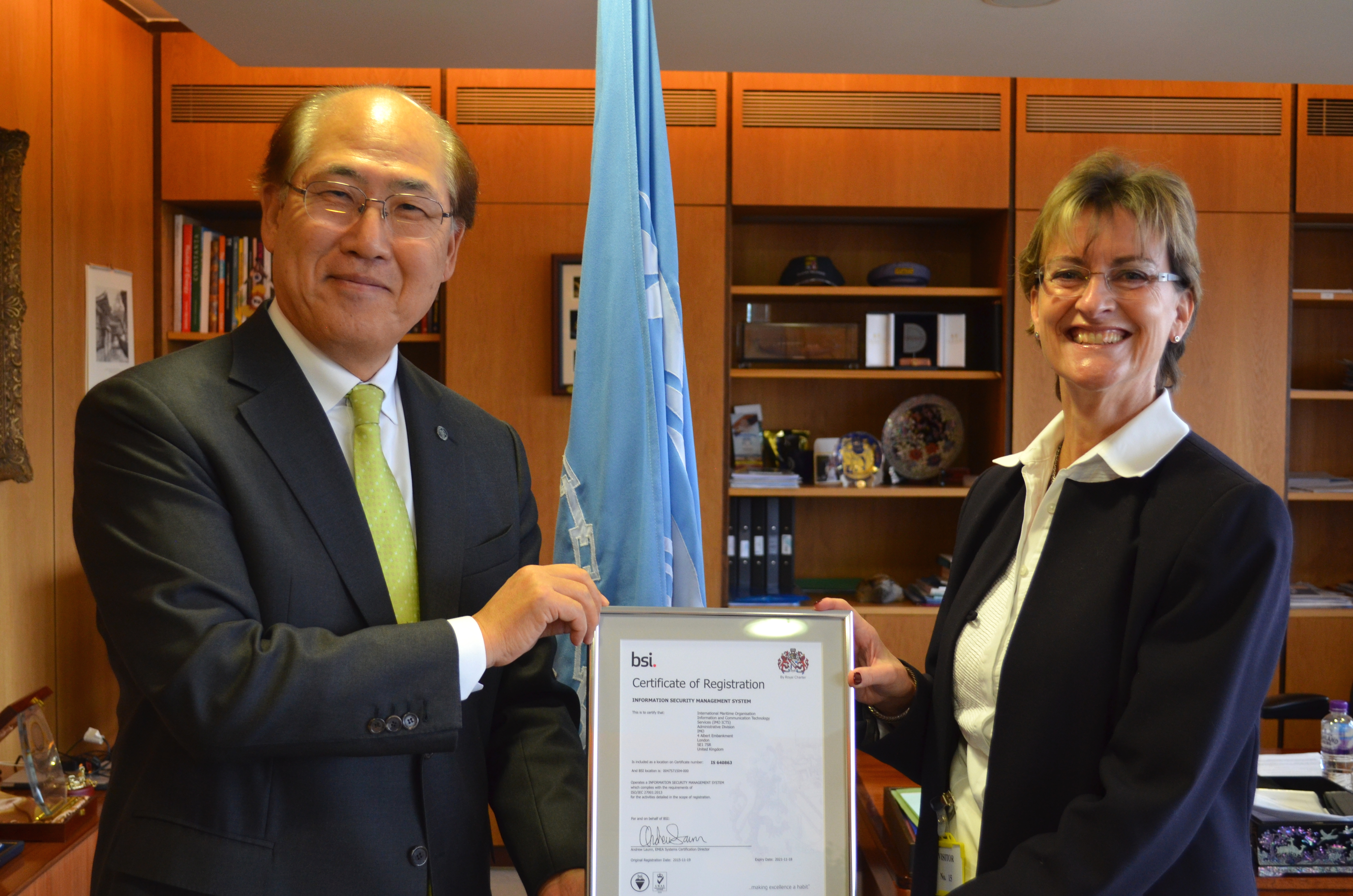
BSI representative presenting a standards certification to the International Maritime Organization in 2018

With 80,000 clients, BSI is one of the world's largest certification bodies. It audits and provides certification to companies worldwide who implement management systems standards. BSI also runs training courses that cover the implementation and auditing requirements of national and international management systems standards.

It is independently accredited and assesses a wide range of standards and other specifications, including:

- PAS 99 (Integrated Management System)
- SA 8000 (Social Accountability Management Systems)
- ISO 9001 (Quality Management Systems)
- AS 9100, AS 9110, AS 9120 (Quality Management Systems for Aviation, Space and Defense)
- ISO 13485 (Quality Management Systems for Medical Devices)
- ISO 14001 (Environment Management Systems)
- ISO 14064 (Greenhouse Gases)
- ISO 19650 (Building Information Modelling)
- ISO/IEC 20000 (Information Technology Service Management)
- ISO 22000 (Food Safety Management Systems)
- ISO 22301 (Business Continuity Management Systems)
- ISO/IEC 27001 (Information Security Management Systems)
- ISO 31000 (Risk Management)
- ISO 45001 (Occupational Health and Safety Management Systems)
- ISO 50001 (Energy Management Systems)
- RSPO (Roundtable on Sustainable Palm Oil)
- EUETS (EU Emissions Trading System)

== Testing services and healthcare ==
BSI Group Kitemark certification symbol

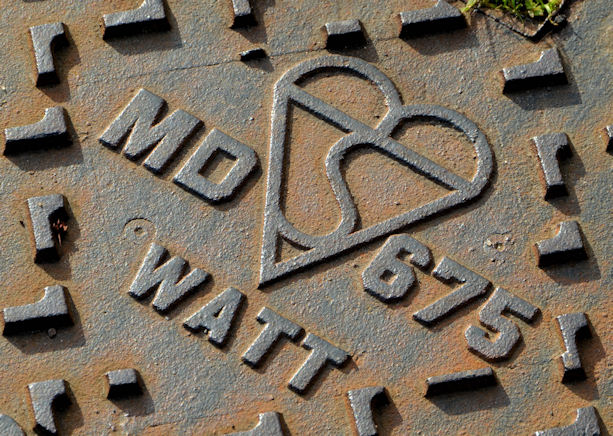
Kitemark symbol as seen on an access cover in Newtownards, Northern Ireland

BSI's best known product in the UK is the Kitemark, a registered certification mark first used in 1903. The Kitemark – which is recognized by 82% of UK adults – signifies products or services which have been assessed and tested as meeting the requirements of the related specification or standard within a Kitemark scheme.

BSI also conducts testing of products for a range of certifications, including for CE marking. CE marking must be applied to a wide range of products intended for sale in the European Economic Area. Frequently, manufacturers or importers need a third-party certification of their product from an accredited or 'Notified' body. BSI holds Notified Body status for 15 EU Directives, including construction products, marine equipment, pressurized equipment and personal protective equipment.

BSI also conducts testing for manufacturers developing new products and has facilities to test across a wide range of sectors, including construction, fire safety, electrical and electronic and engineering products.

BSI provides regulatory and quality management reviews and product certification for medical device manufacturers in the Worldwide. It is the market leader in the US, the world's biggest healthcare market.

== Acquisitions ==
Starting in 1998, BSI Group has adopted a policy of international growth through acquisition as follows:

- 1998: CEEM, USA and International Standards Certification Pte Ltd, Singapore
- 2002: KPMG's certification business in North America
- 2003: BSI Pacific Ltd, Hong Kong
- 2004: KPMG's certification business in the Netherlands
- 2006: Nis Zert, Germany; Entropy International Ltd, Canada & UK; Benchmark Certification Pty Ltd, Australia; ASI-QS, UK
- 2009: Supply Chain Security Division of First Advantage Corp. USA; Certification International S.r.l, Italy; EUROCAT, Germany
- 2010: GLCS, the leading certifier of gas related consumer equipment in the UK and one of the top three in Europe, the certification business of BS Services Italia S.r.l. (BSS); Systems Management Indonesia (SMI).
- 2013: 9 May 2013 – NCS International and its daughter company NCSI Americas, Inc.
- 2015: 24 January – EORM, a US consultancy specialising in environmental, health, safety (EHS) and sustainability services
- 2015: 30 January – the management systems certification business of PwC in South Africa
- 2015: 3 June – Hill County Environmental Inc, a US environmental and engineering services consultancy
- 2016: 4 April – Espion Ltd and Espion UK, experts at managing and securing corporate information
- 2016: 15 August – Atrium Environmental Health and Safety Services LLC, experts in occupational safety, industrial safety and environmental compliance
- 2016: 22 September – Creative Environment Solutions (CES) Corp., an Environmental and Safety consulting firm
- 2016: 4 October – Info-Assure Ltd, a leading provider of cyber security and information assurance
- 2016: 15 December – Quantum Management Group Inc, a US environmental, health and safety (EHS) consultancy
- 2017: 5 December – Neville Clarke, the Business Process Improvement Expert
- 2018: 8 November – AirCert GmbH, a specialist aerospace certification company located in Munich, Germany
- 2019: 3 April – AppSec Consulting, a US cybersecurity and information resilience company
- 2021: 1 February – Q-Audit, a JAS-ANZ accredited healthcare auditing body based in Sydney, Australia and Auckland, New Zealand.

== BSI Identify ==
In 2021, BSI Group, with support from the Construction Products Association, led the development of a product identification and traceability system known as BSI Identify. The initiative responded to recommendations made by Dame Judith Hackitt following her review of building safety, which called for wider adoption of permanent product marking and consistent labelling systems to improve traceability across the built environment sector.

BSI Identify uses new Digital Object Identifier (DOI) technology "to deliver a unique, constant, and interoperable identifier", known as a BSI UPIN, "which can be assigned to products to help UK manufacturers to directly manage information about their products in the supply chain". The aim of the BSI Identify programme is that "wherever you are with [a] product, you can take a snapshot of the QR code with your mobile device, and it will immediately take you to the product technical data sheet. You can see exactly what product it is, you can answer any questions about it, you can see installation advice, etc."

== Coat of arms ==
The BSI coat of arms was granted by the College of Arms in 1951.

Coat of arms of British Standards Institution

Granted
3 January 1951.
Crest
On a wreath of the colours two hands couped at the wrist holding an open book Proper bound Gules edged Or.
Escutcheon
Argent on a bend Gules between a retort Proper the bowl half-filled with liquid Azure and a hank of cotton palewise of the last a girder couped of the first.
Supporters
On either side a lion guardant gules, that to the dexter holding with the interior forepaw a plumbline Or, and that to the sinister holding in the interior forepaw a plumbline Or, and that to the sinister holding in the interior forepaw a pair of scales gold.
Motto
Essem Quam Videri

== See also ==
- British Electrotechnical Approvals Board
- British Approvals Board for Telecommunications
- European Committee for Electrotechnical Standardization (CENELEC)
- European Committee for Standardization (CEN)
- European Telecommunications Standards Institute (ETSI)
- International Electrotechnical Commission
- International standards
- List of Ig Nobel Prize winners
- UKAS
- Standards organization
- The International Customer Service Institute (TICSI)
- Trading Standards Institute
