= Type Allocation Code =

Component of wireless ID coded

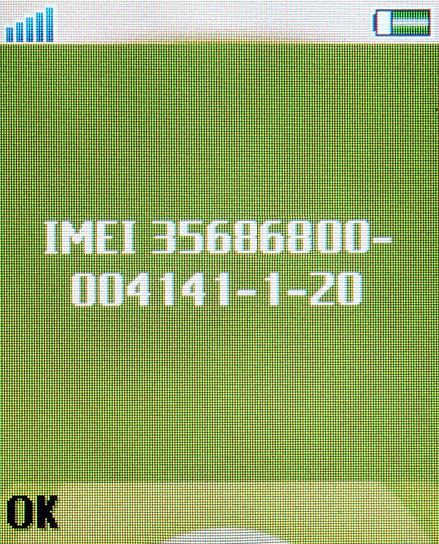
Phone screenshot showing the IMEI number.

The Type Allocation Code (TAC) is the initial eight-digit portion of the 15-digit IMEI and 16-digit IMEISV codes used to uniquely identify Wireless devices.

The Type Allocation Code identifies a particular model (and often revision) of wireless telephone for use on a GSM, UMTS, LTE, 5G NR, iDEN, Iridium or other IMEI-employing wireless network.

The first two digits of the TAC are the Reporting Body Identifier. This indicates the GSMA-approved group that allocated the TAC.

Prior to January 1, 2003, the global standard for the IMEI started with a six-digit Type Approval Code followed by a two-digit Final Assembly Code (FAC). The Type Approval Code (also known as TAC) indicated that the particular device was approved by a national GSM approval body and the FAC identified the company that had built and assembled the device (which is not always the same as the brand name stamped on the device).

Effective on that date, many GSM member nations and entities (mainly Europe) moved away from requiring that devices be approved by national bodies, and towards a system where device manufacturers self-regulate the device market. As a result, a manufacturer now simply requests an eight-digit Type Allocation Code for a new phone model from the international GSM standards body, instead of submitting a device for approval to a national review body.

Both the old and new TAC uniquely identify a model of phone, although some models may have more than one code, depending on revision, manufacturing location, and other factors.

== Public TAC databases ==
The authoritative database maintained by GSMA is named GSMA Device Database and is only made available to partners. However, there are many public alternatives, though they will not be fully up to date.

The Osmocom project maintains a crowdsourced TAC database, which is CC-BY-SA v3.0 licensed and fully downloadable.

Some OEMs publish TAC data for their products:

- Sony: https://app.swup.update.sony.net/ess-distribution/public/api/product/v2

== TAC examples ==
TAC	Manufacturer	Model	Internal Model Number
01124500	Apple		
01130000			
01136400	Apple		
01154600	Apple	iPhone	MB384LL
01161200	Apple	iPhone 3G	
01174400	Apple	iPhone 3G	MB496RS
01180800	Apple	iPhone 3G	MB704LL
01181200	Apple	iPhone 3G	MB496B
01193400	Apple	iPhone 3G	
01194800	Apple	iPhone 3GS	
01215800	Apple	iPhone 3GS	
01215900	Apple	iPhone 3GS	MC131B
01216100	Apple	iPhone 3GS	
01226800	Apple	iPhone 3GS	
01233600	Apple	iPhone 4	MC608LL
01233700	Apple	iPhone 4	MC603B
01233800	Apple	iPhone 4	MC610LL
01241700	Apple	iPhone 4	
01242000	Apple	iPhone 4	
01243000	Apple	iPhone 4	MC603KS
01253600	Apple	iPhone 4	MC610LL/A
01254200	Apple	iPhone 4	
01300600	Apple	iPhone 4S	MD260C
01326300	Apple	iPhone 4	MD198HN/A
01332700	Apple	iPhone 5	MD642C
01388300	Apple	iPhone 5S	ME297C/A
35875105	Apple	iPhone 5S	A1533
35875205	Apple	iPhone 5S	A1533
35875305	Apple	iPhone 5S	A1533
35875405	Apple	iPhone 5S	A1533
35875505	Apple	iPhone 5S	A1533
35875605	Apple	iPhone 5S	A1453
35875705	Apple	iPhone 5S	A1453
35875805	Apple	iPhone 5S	A1453
35875905	Apple	iPhone 5S	A1453
35876005	Apple	iPhone 5S	A1453
35880005	Apple	iPhone 5C	A1507
35880105	Apple	iPhone 5C	A1507
35880205	Apple	iPhone 5C	A1507
35880305	Apple	iPhone 5C	A1507
35880405	Apple	iPhone 5C	A1507
35880505	Apple	iPhone 5S	A1453
35880605	Apple	iPhone 5S	A1453
35880705	Apple	iPhone 5S	A1453
35951406	Samsung	Galaxy Tab E	SM-T5613474
35880805	Apple	iPhone 5S	A1453
35880905	Apple	iPhone 5S	A1453
35881005	Apple	iPhone 5S	A1533
35881105	Apple	iPhone 5S	A1533
35881205	Apple	iPhone 5S	A1533
35881305	Apple	iPhone 5S	A1533
35881405	Apple	iPhone 5S	A1533
35881505	Apple	iPhone 5C	A1456
35881605	Apple	iPhone 5C	A1456
35881705	Apple	iPhone 5C	A1456
35881805	Apple	iPhone 5C	A1456
35881905	Apple	iPhone 5C	A1456
35201906	Apple	iPhone 5S	A1457
35925406	Apple	iPhone 6	A1549
35438506	Apple	iPhone 6+	A1522
35325807	Apple	iPhone 6S	A1633
35299209	Apple	iPhone 8	A1905
3530340	Apple	iPad 6th gen	A1954
35103627	Apple	iPad 9th gen	A2603
35676211	Apple	iPad Air 4th gen	A2324
3576677	Apple	iPad Air 5th gen	A2589
350151..	Nokia	3330	
35705623	Nokia	FastMile 5G Gateway 3.2	5G15-12W
35089080	Nokia	3410	NHM-2NX
35099480	Nokia	3410	NHM-2NX
35148420	Nokia	3410	NHM-2NX
35148820	Nokia	6310i	NPL-1
35151304	Nokia	E72-1	RM-530
35154900	Nokia	6310i	NPL-1
35171005	Sony Ericsson	Xperia S	
35174605	Google	Galaxy Nexus	Samsung GT-I9250, Samsung GT-I9250TSGGEN
35191405	Motorola	Defy Mini	
35226005	Samsung	Galaxy SIII	
35044670	Siemens	A50	
35238402	Sony Ericsson	K770i	
35274901	Nokia	6233	
35291402	Nokia	6210 Navigator	
35316004	ZTE	Blade	
35316605	Samsung	Galaxy S III	GT-I9300
35332705	Samsung	Galaxy S II	GT-I9100
35328504	Samsung	Galaxy S	GT-I9000
32930400	Samsung	Galaxy S7	
35351200	Motorola	V300	
35357800	Samsung	SGH-A800	
35376800	Nokia	6230	
35391805	Google	Nexus 4	LG E960
35405600	Wavecom	M1306B	
35421803	Nokia	5310	RM-303
35433004	Nokia	C5-00	RM-645
35450502	GlobeTrotter	HSDPA Modem	
35511405	Sony Ericsson	Xperia U	
35524803	Nokia	2330C-2	RM-512
35566600	Nokia	6230	
35569500	Nokia	1100	
35679404	Samsung	Galaxy Mini	GT-S5570
35685702	Nokia	6300	
35693803	Nokia	N900	
35694603	Nokia	2700	
35699601	Nokia	N95	
35700804	Nokia	C1	
35714904	Huawei	E398U-15 LTE Stick	
35733104	Samsung	Galaxy Gio	
35739804	Nokia	N8	
35744105	Samsung	Galaxy S4	GT-I9505
35765206	Sony	Xperia Z3 Compact	D5803
35788104	Nokia	N950	
35803106	HTC	HTC One M8s	
35824005	Google	Nexus 5	LG D820/D821
35828103	Nokia	6303C	
35836800	Nokia	6230i	
35837501	XDA	Orbit 2	
35837800	Nokia	N6030	RM-74
35838706	LG	G Stylo	LG-H631
35850000	Nokia	Lumia 720	
35851004	Sony Ericsson	Xperia Active	
35853704	Samsung	Galaxy SII	
35869205	Apple	iPhone 5S	MF353TA/A
35876105	Apple	iPhone 5S	A1457
35896704	HTC	Desire S	
35902803	HTC	Wildfire	
35903908	Samsung	Galaxy S8	SM-G950F
35909205	Samsung	Galaxy Note 3	SM-N9000, SM-N9005, SM-N900
35918804	HTC	One X	
35920605	Nokia	Lumia 625	
35447909	Nokia	Nokia 1	TA-1079
35604008	Nokia	Nokia 2	TA-1023
35602508	Nokia	Nokia 5	TA-1027
35929005	Motorola	Moto G	XT1039
35933005	OROD	6468	
35935003	Nokia	2720A-2	RM-519
35972100	Lobster	544	
35974101	GlobeTrotter	HSDPA Modem	
35979504	Samsung	Galaxy Note	
449337..	Nokia	6210	
86107402	Quectel	Queclink GV200	
86217001	Quectel	Queclink GV200	
86723902	ZTE Corporation	Rook from EE, Orange Dive 30, Blade A410	
86813001	Jiayu	G3S	JY-G3
00000000	N/A	typical fake TAC codes, usually in software damaged phones	
01234567	N/A	typical fake TAC codes, usually in software damaged phones	
12345678	N/A	typical fake TAC codes, usually in software damaged phones	
13579024	N/A	typical fake TAC codes, usually in software damaged phones	
88888888	N/A	typical fake TAC codes, usually in software damaged phones	
01333200	Apple	iPhone 5	
99000481	Samsung	Galaxy note 4 GM-N910V	
35808005	Sony	Sony C6833 - XPERIA Z ULTRA	
35815207	Samsung	Samsung S7	
35415808	Samsung	Samsung J7 Prime	
35664906	Samsung	Xcover 271	GT-B2710
35330509	Samsung	Galaxy S9	SM-G960U
35326907	Apple	iPhone 6s	A1688
35197310	irisguard	EyePay Phone	
35664906	Samsung	Xcover 271	GT-B2710
35314409	Go Mobile	GO Onyx LTE	GO1004
86092103	Huawei	P9 Lite 2016	
35293708	Samsung	Galaxy A5 2016	SM-A510F
35684610	Samsung	Galaxy Fold 5G	
01459300	WondaLink	T-Mobile LineLink	ML700
86881303	Xiaomi	Redmi Note 5	
35620409	Samsung	Galaxy J7 2017	
35253108	Google	Google Pixel	
35803408	Google	Google Pixel 2 XL (Verizon)	G011C
35803508	Google	Google Pixel 2 XL (Unlocked)	G011C
35964309	Google	Google Pixel 3a XL	
35751110	Google	Google Pixel 4a	
35751310	Google	Google Pixel 4a	
86551004	OnePlus	OnePlus 7 Pro (T-Mobile)	GM1915
86492106	OnePlus	OnePlus 11	CPH2451
35263970	Jolla	Jolla Phone 2026	JP2601

== TAC block ==
Governments, telcos and/or carriers may block devices based on their TAC, for various purposes.

=== New Zealand RBI broadband service TAC lock ===
In New Zealand with the rollout of the government subsidized rural broadband initiative a way was required to prevent users inserting the rural broadband SIM cards in an unauthorized devices to get subsidized data rates.

The use of a TAC lock by the use of a customized SIM card with embedded TAC codes was devised. Several Type allocation codes can be stored in the SIM cards of the device to allow a group of provider-supplied Huawei branded 4G modems and block the use of unauthorized and third-party devices on the network.

A company wishing to resell Vodafone RBI is required to supply a device for the approval process and certification, and to supply One NZ with the TAC details of this device to embed into the SIM cards at the point of manufacture. A minimum order of 500 SIM cards is required.

== See also ==
- International mobile subscriber identity (IMSI)
- International Mobile Equipment Identity (IMEI)
- SIM lock
