= GSMA =

Mobile communications industry organisation

GSM Association
- Abbreviation: GSMA
- Formation: 1995; 31 years ago
- Type: Industry trade body
- Purpose: Representing mobile network operators
- Headquarters: London, England, UK
- Members: 1200+ companies
- Website: www.gsma.com

The GSM Association (GSMA) (Note: GSM is originally an abbreviation for Global System for Mobile Communications, named Groupe Spécial Mobile before that.) is the advocacy and lobbying organization for the mobile communications industry, Representing mobile operators and organisations across the mobile ecosystem and adjacent industries, the GSMA delivers for its members across three broad pillars: Connectivity for Good, Industry Solutions and Events. It is headquartered in London, England.

Although legally a non-profit trade association, the GSMA operates on an commercial scale generating estimated annual revenues of approximately $668 million, largely through its flagship event series, the Mobile World Congress (MWC). The MWC event in Barcelona alone contributed over €561 million to the local economy in a recent year, demonstrating the event's massive commercial engine.

This funding is reinvested to support the organization's primary missions, which include:

- Global Advocacy and Lobbying on behalf of its members, especially concerning radio spectrum allocation and telecom regulatory policy.
- Technical Standardization for mobile technologies (from GSM to 5G and beyond).
- Industry Convening through its major global events.

== History ==
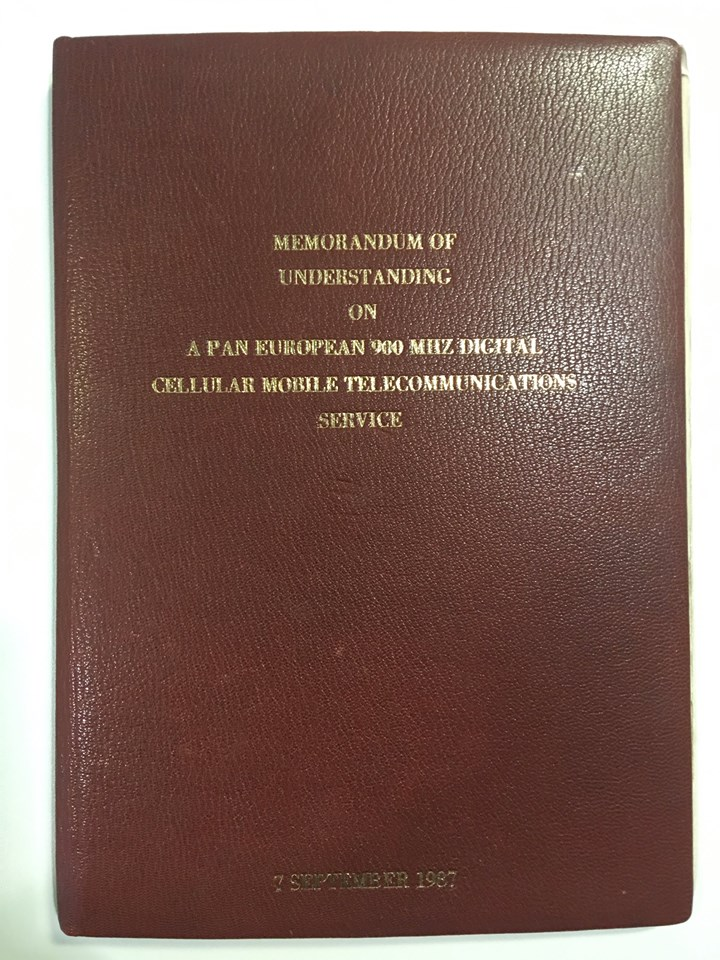
The original GSM MoU document: "A Pan-European 900 MHz Digital Cellular Mobile Telecommunications Service" (dated 7 September 1987)

Logo variant with the dots at the top symbolizing clients in a network

The GSMA was formed in 1995 as the GSM MoU Association as a body to support and promote mobile operators using the GSM (Global System for Mobile communications) standard for cellular networks. It traces its history back to a memorandum of understanding signed in 1987 by 13 operators in 12 countries that committed to deploying GSM for mobile services.

== Membership and governance ==
Full membership of the GSMA is open to licensed mobile operators using a GSM family technology. Approximately 750 such operators around the world are full GSMA members. Associate membership of the GSMA is open to non-operator companies active in the mobile ecosystem. These include handset and device makers, software companies, equipment providers and Internet companies, as well as organisations in industry sectors such as financial services, healthcare, media, transport and utilities. There are approximately 400 GSMA member companies in this category.

The GSMA board has 25 representatives from the world's largest operator groups and selected smaller operators, and is elected bi-annually. José María Álvarez-Pallete López, CEO(2016-2025) of Telefónica Group, became GSMA Chairman in January 2022.

The present Director General of the GSMA, Vivek Badrinath, took office in April 2025 (replaced Mats Granryd, who took office in January 2016).

== Programmes and advocacy ==
The GSMA manages industry programmes in collaboration with its members with the aim of achieving scale and interoperability for new mobile technologies. It has three active programmes: 'Future Networks' (promoting standards such as Rich Communication Services and Voice over LTE); 'Identity'; and the 'Internet of Things'.

It also runs industry working groups covering areas such as roaming and interconnection, fraud and security, and intellectual property, as well as various other specialist committees and groups.

The GSMA represents the mobile industry to governments and institutions where it advocates policy and regulatory positions on behalf of its members. Its stated goals in this area is to ensure that mobile telecoms "policy and regulatory frameworks are fair, flexible and future-proof"; that radio spectrum is made available for mobile services "in a timely and fair manner"; and to promote the use of mobile services in emerging markets.

As part of its Industry Purpose programme, the GSMA is supporting the United Nations' Sustainable Development Goals.

== Events ==
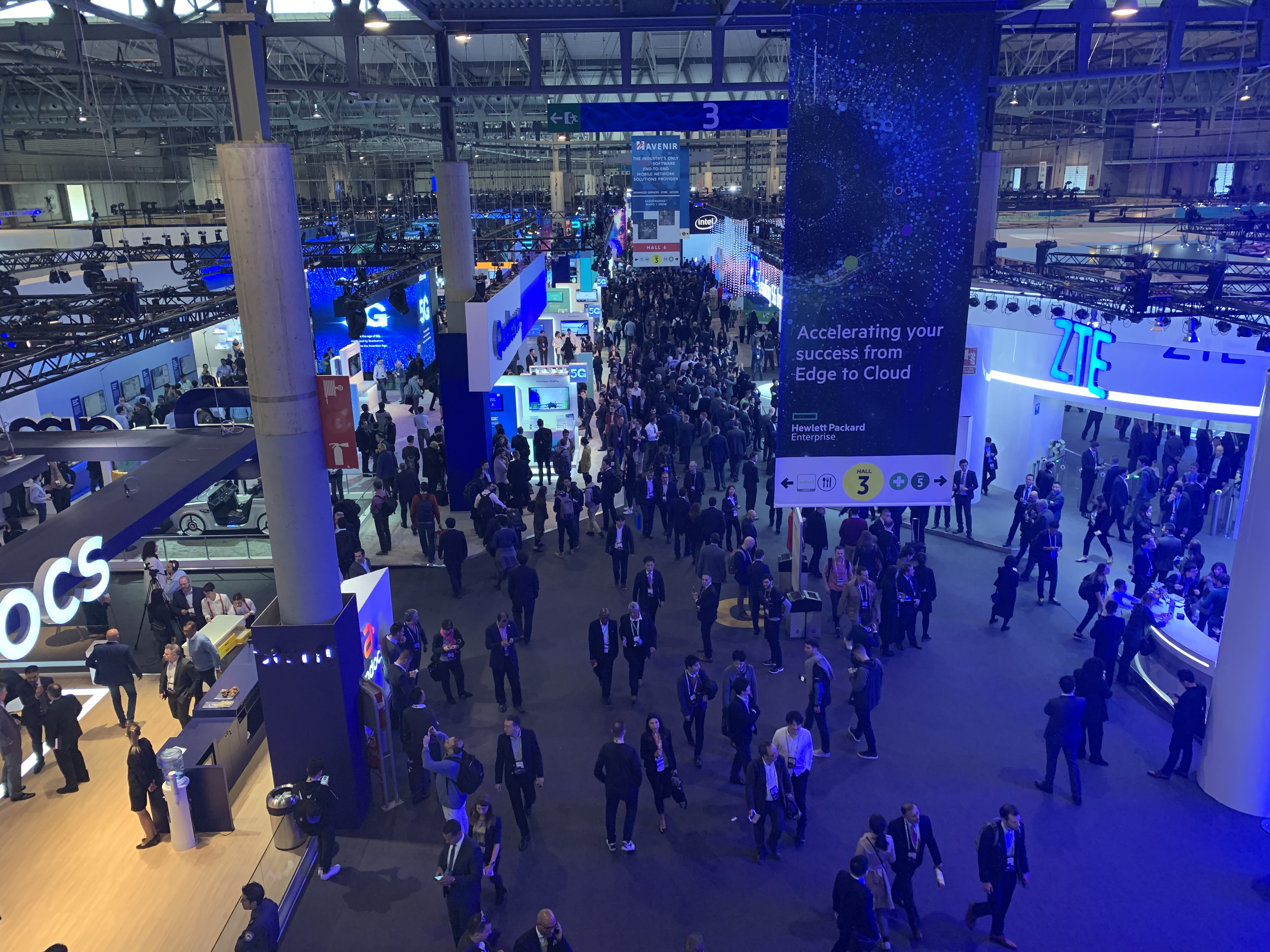
Exhibition floor at GSMA MWC Barcelona 2019

The GSMA's MWC Barcelona (formerly Mobile World Congress) is the largest annual exhibition and conference dedicated to the mobile industry, attracting more than 109,000 visitors in 2019. The event was first held in 1987.

Since 2006, the event has been hosted in Barcelona and is currently located at the Fira Gran Via venue. In 2019 the event was recognised, for the fourth time, as the Guinness World Record holder for the world's largest carbon-neutral tradeshow.

In addition to MWC Barcelona, the GSMA organises MWC Kigali (formerly MWC Africa), MWC Shanghai, MWC Las Vegas (formerly MWC Los Angeles), 4YFN MWC Doha and the M360 series of regional events, but the brand remains most synonymous with the Barcelona event.

== TAC/IMEI database ==
The GSMA is the global administrator of Type Allocation Code (TAC), which is used to create the International Mobile Equipment Identity number that can uniquely identify wireless devices.

It allocates official IMEI number ranges to all manufacturers of 3GPP compliant devices and records these ranges and device model information in a database. It offers a device look up and identification service based on this database that allows authorised third-party organisations to identify the manufacturer and model of a mobile device using the IMEI.
