= List of IEC technical committees =

IEC technical committees

The International Electrotechnical Commission (IEC) is a standards-making body in the field of electrical and electronics technologies. The IEC works with National Committees in different countries in preparing and maintaining standards in this space. IEC is one of the oldest standards making bodies in existence.

== Standards ==
The IEC standards making process, similar to many other standards making processes, is handled by various technical committees (TC) and subcommittees (SC). TCs report to the SMB (Standardization Management Board). Each TC defines its scope (or area of activity) which is submitted to the SMB for approval. Any TC can form one or more SCs depending on the extent of its work programme. SCs define their scope under the parent TC to which they report directly.

TC membership is composed of the IEC NCs (National Committees), all of which are free to take part in the work of any given TC.

IEC has more than 11000 technical experts working on standards voluntarily.

This list is intended to detail the various technical committees of IEC, the scope of the committees, their key members, and the key relevance and outputs of these committees.

Each technical committee and its standardization efforts is vast and is carried out by various working groups within the technical committees.

== IEC technical committees and subcommittees ==
Technical Committee	Description
TC 1	Terminology
TC 2	Rotating machinery
TC 3	Information structures and elements, identification and marking principles, documentation and graphical symbols
SC 3C	Graphical symbols for use on equipment
SC 3D	Product properties and classes and their identification
TC 4	Hydraulic turbines
TC 5	Steam Turbines
TC 7	Overhead electrical conductors
TC 8	Systems aspects for electrical energy supply
SC 8A	Grid Integration of Renewable Energy Generation
SC 8B	Decentralized Electrical Energy Systems
TC 9	Electrical equipment and systems for railways
TC 10	Fluids for electrotechnical applications
TC 11	Overhead lines
TC 12	(Disbanded, work taken over by TC 100) Radio communication
TC 13	Electrical energy measurement and control
TC 14	Power transformers
TC 15	Solid electrical insulating materials
TC 16	(Disbanded, work taken over by TC 3) Basic and safety principles for man-machine interface, marking and identification
TC 17	High-voltage switchgear and controlgear
SC 17A	Switching devices
SC 17B	(Transformed into SC 121A) Low-voltage switchgear and controlgear
SC 17C	Assemblies
SC 17D	(Transformed into SC 121B) Low-voltage switchgear and controlgear assemblies
TC 18	Electrical installations of ships and of mobile and fixed offshore units
SC 18A	Electric cables for ships and mobile and fixed offshore units
TC 20	Electric cables
TC 21	Secondary cells and batteries
SC 21A	Secondary cells and batteries containing alkaline or other non-acid electrolytes
TC 22	Power electronic systems and equipment
SC 22E	Stabilized power supplies
SC 22F	Power electronics for electrical transmission and distribution systems
SC 22G	Adjustable speed electric drive systems incorporating semiconductor power converters
SC 22H	Uninterruptible power systems (UPS)
TC 23	Electrical accessories
SC 23A	Cable management systems
SC 23B	Plugs, socket-outlets and switches
SC 23C	(Disbanded, work taken over by SC 23B) World-wide plug and socket-outlet systems
SC 23E	Circuit-breakers and similar equipment for household use
SC 23F	(Disbanded, work taken over by TC 23) Connecting devices
SC 23G	Appliance couplers
SC 23H	Plugs, Socket-outlets and Couplers for industrial and similar applications, and for Electric Vehicles
SC 23J	Switches for appliances
SC 23K	Electrical Energy Efficiency products
TC 25	Quantities and units
TC 26	Electric welding
TC 27	Industrial electroheating and electromagnetic processing
TC 28	Insulation co-ordination
TC 29	Electroacoustics
TC 31	Equipment for explosive atmospheres
SC 31G	Intrinsically-safe apparatus
SC 31J	Classification of hazardous areas and installation requirements
SC 31M	Non-electrical equipment and protective systems for explosive atmospheres
TC 32	Fuses
SC 32A	High-voltage fuses
SC 32B	Low-voltage fuses
SC 32C	Miniature fuses
TC 33	Power capacitors and their applications
TC 34	Lamps and related equipment
SC 34A	Lamps
SC 34B	Lamp caps and holders
SC 34C	Auxiliaries for lamps
SC 34D	Luminaires
TC 35	Primary cells and batteries
TC 36	Insulators
SC 36A	Insulated bushings
SC 36B	(Disbanded, work taken over by TC 36) Insulators for overhead lines
SC 36C	(Disbanded, work taken over by TC 36) Insulators for substations
TC 37	Surge arresters
SC 37A	Low-voltage surge protective devices
SC 37B	Components for low-voltage surge protection
TC 38	Instrument transformers
TC 39	(Disbanded, work taken over by TC 36) Electronic tubes
TC 40	Capacitors and resistors for electronic equipment
TC 42	High-voltage and high-current test techniques
TC 44	Safety of machinery - Electrotechnical aspects
TC 45	Nuclear instrumentation
SC 45A	Instrumentation, control and electrical power systems of nuclear facilities
SC 45B	Radiation protection instrumentation
TC 46	Cables, wires, waveguides, RF connectors, RF and microwave passive components and accessories
SC 46A	Coaxial cables
SC 46C	Wires and symmetric cables
SC 46F	RF and microwave passive components
TC 47	Semiconductor devices
SC 47A	Integrated circuits
SC 47B	(Disbanded, work taken over by JTC 1/SC 25) Microprocessor systems
SC 47D	Semiconductor devices packaging
SC 47E	Discrete semiconductor devices
SC 47F	Micro-electromechanical systems
TC 48	Electrical connectors and mechanical structures for electrical and electronic equipment
SC 48B	Connectors
SC 48D	Mechanical structures for electronic equipment
TC 49	Piezoelectric, dielectric and electrostatic devices and associated materials for frequency control, selection and detection
TC 51	Magnetic components, ferrite and magnetic powder materials
TC 55	Winding wires
TC 56	Dependability
TC 57	Power systems management and associated information exchange
TC 59	Performance of household and similar electrical appliances
SC 59A	Electric dishwashers
SC 59C	Heating appliances
SC 59D	Performance of household and similar electrical laundry appliances
SC 59F	Surface cleaning appliances
SC 59K	Performance of household and similar electrical cooking appliances
SC 59L	Small household appliances
SC 59M	Performance of electrical household and similar cooling and freezing appliances
TC 61	Safety of household and similar electrical appliances
SC 61B	Safety of microwave appliances for household and commercial use
SC 61C	Safety of refrigeration appliances for household and commercial use
SC 61D	Appliances for air-conditioning for household and similar purposes
SC 61E	(Disbanded, taken over by TC 61) Safety of electrical commercial catering equipment
SC 61H	Safety of electrically operated farm appliances
SC 61J	Electrical motor-operated cleaning appliances for commercial use
TC 62	Electrical equipment in medical practice
SC 62A	Common aspects of electrical equipment used in medical practice
SC 62B	Diagnostic imaging equipment
SC 62C	Equipment for radiotherapy, nuclear medicine and radiation dosimetry
SC 62D	Electromedical equipment
TC 64	Electrical installations and protection against electric shock
TC 65	Industrial-process measurement, control and automation
SC 65A	System aspects
SC 65B	Measurement and control devices
SC 65C	Industrial networks
SC 65E	Devices and integration in enterprise systems
TC 66	Safety of measuring, control and laboratory equipment
TC 68	Magnetic alloys and steels
TC 69	Electric road vehicles and electric industrial trucks
TC 70	Degrees of protection provided by enclosures
TC 72	Automatic controls for household use
TC 73	Short-circuit currents
TC 76	Optical radiation safety and laser equipment
TC 77	Electromagnetic compatibility
SC 77A	EMC - Low frequency phenomena
SC 77B	High frequency phenomena
SC 77C	High power transient phenomena
TC 78	Live working
TC 79	Alarm and electronic security systems
TC 80	Maritime navigation and radiocommunication equipment and systems
TC 81	Lightning protection
TC 82	Solar photovoltaic energy systems
TC 85	Measuring equipment for electrical and electromagnetic quantities
TC 86	Fibre optics
SC 86A	Fibres and cables
SC 86B	Fibre optic interconnecting devices and passive components
SC 86C	Fibre optic systems and active devices
TC 87	Ultrasonics
TC 88	Wind energy generation systems
TC 89	Fire hazard testing
TC 90	Superconductivity
TC 91	Electronics assembly technology
TC 93	(Disbanded, work taken over by TC 91) Design automation
TC 94	All-or-nothing electrical relays
TC 95	Measuring relays and protection equipment
TC 96	Transformers, reactors, power supply units, and combinations thereof
TC 97	Electrical installations for lighting and beaconing of aerodromes
TC 99	System engineering and erection of electrical power installations in systems with nominal voltages above 1 kV a.c. and 1,5 kV d.c., particularly concerning safety aspects
TC 100	Audio, video and multimedia systems and equipment
TA 1	Terminals for audio, video and data services and contents
TA 2	Colour measurement and management
TA 4	Digital system interfaces and protocols
TA 5	Cable networks for television signals, sound signals and interactive services
TA 6	Storage media, storage data structures, storage systems and equipment
TA 8	Multimedia home systems and applications for end-user network
TA 9	(Disbanded) Audio, video and multimedia applications for end-user network
TA 10	Multimedia e-publishing and e-book technologies
TA 11	Quality for audio, video and multimedia systems
TA 12	AV energy efficiency and smart grid applications
TA 13	Environment for AV and multimedia equipment (tentative title)
TA 14	Interfaces and methods of measurement for personal computing equipment
TA 15	Wireless Power Transfer
TA 16	Active Assisted Living (AAL), accessibility and user interfaces
TA 17	Multimedia systems and equipment for cars
TC 101	Electrostatics
TC 103	Transmitting equipment for radiocommunication
TC 104	Environmental conditions, classification and methods of test
TC 105	Fuel cell technologies
TC 106	Methods for the assessment of electric, magnetic and electromagnetic fields associated with human exposure
TC 107	Process management for avionics
TC 108	Safety of electronic equipment within the field of audio/video, information technology and communication technology
TC 109	Insulation co-ordination for low-voltage equipment
TC 110	Electronic display devices
TC 111	Environmental standardization for electrical and electronic products and systems
TC 112	Evaluation and qualification of electrical insulating materials and systems
TC 113	Nanotechnology for electrotechnical products and systems
TC 114	Marine energy - Wave and tidal and other water current converters
TC 115	High Voltage Direct Current (HVDC) transmission for DC voltages above 100 kV
TC 116	Safety of motor-operated electric tools
TC 117	Solar thermal electric plants
PC 118	Smart grid user interface
TC 119	Printed Electronics
TC 120	Electrical Energy Storage (EES) Systems
TC 121	Switchgear and controlgear and their assemblies for low voltage
SC 121A	Low-voltage switchgear and controlgear
SC 121B	Low-voltage switchgear and controlgear assemblies
TC 122	UHV AC transmission systems
TC 123	Standardization of the management of assets in power systems
TC 124	Wearable Electronic Devices and Technologies
CISPR	International special committee on radio interference
CIS/A	Radio-interference measurements and statistical methods
CIS/B	Interference relating to industrial, scientific and medical radio-frequency apparatus, to other (heavy) industrial equipment, to overhead power lines, to high voltage equipment and to electric traction
CIS/D	Electromagnetic disturbances related to electric/electronic equipment on vehicles and internal combustion engine powered devices
CIS/F	Interference relating to household appliances tools, lighting equipment and similar apparatus
CIS/H	Limits for the protection of radio services
CIS/I	Electromagnetic compatibility of information technology equipment, multimedia equipment and receivers
CIS/S	Steering Committee of CISPR
SyC AAL	Active Assisted Living
SyC LVDC	Low Voltage Direct Current and Low Voltage Direct Current for Electricity Access
SyC Smart Cities	Electrotechnical aspects of Smart Cities
SyC Smart Energy	Smart Energy
ISO/IEC JPC 2	(Disbanded) Energy efficiency and renewable energy sources - Common international terminology
ISO/IEC JTC 1	Information technology
ISO/IEC JTC 1/SWG 1	(Disbanded) Accessibility (SWG-A)
ISO/IEC JTC 1/SWG 2	(Disbanded) SWG - Directives
ISO/IEC JTC 1/SWG 3	(Disbanded) Planning
ISO/IEC JTC 1/SWG 5	(Disbanded) Internet of Things (IoT)
ISO/IEC JTC 1/SWG 6	(Disbanded) Management
ISO/IEC JTC 1/WG 7	(Disbanded) Sensor Networks
ISO/IEC JTC 1/WG 8	(Disbanded) Governance of IT
ISO/IEC JTC 1/SC 2	Coded character sets
ISO/IEC JTC 1/SC 6	Telecommunications and information exchange between systems
ISO/IEC JTC 1/SC 7	Software and systems engineering
ISO/IEC JTC 1/SC 17	Cards and personal identification
ISO/IEC JTC 1/SC 22	Programming languages, their environments and system software interfaces
ISO/IEC JTC 1/SC 23	Digitally recorded media for information interchange and storage
ISO/IEC JTC 1/SC 24	Computer graphics, image processing and environmental data representation
ISO/IEC JTC 1/SC 25	Interconnection of information technology equipment
ISO/IEC JTC 1/SC 27	IT security techniques
ISO/IEC JTC 1/SC 28	Office equipment
ISO/IEC JTC 1/SC 29	Coding of audio, picture, multimedia and hypermedia information
ISO/IEC JTC 1/SC 31	Automatic identification and data capture techniques
ISO/IEC JTC 1/SC 32	Data management and interchange
ISO/IEC JTC 1/SC 34	Document description and processing languages
ISO/IEC JTC 1/SC 35	User interfaces
ISO/IEC JTC 1/SC 36	Information technology for learning, education and training
ISO/IEC JTC 1/SC 37	Biometrics
ISO/IEC JTC 1/SC 38	Cloud Computing and Distributed Platforms
ISO/IEC JTC 1/SC 39	Sustainability for Data Centres and IT
ISO/IEC JTC 1/SC 40	IT Service Management and IT Governance
ISO/IEC JTC 1/SC 41	Internet of Things and related technologies
ISO/IEC JTC 1/SC 42	Artificial Intelligence

== See also ==
- List of ISO standards
- List of IEC standards
- List of EN standards
- International Classification for Standards
- Standardization
