= ISO/IEC 19788 =

International standard

ISO/IEC 19788 Information technology – Learning, education and training – Metadata for learning resources is a multi-part standard prepared by subcommittee SC 36 of the joint technical committee ISO/IEC JTC 1, Information Technology for Learning, Education and Training.

It is recognized as a horizontal standard dealing with a subject relevant to a number of committees or sectors and of crucial importance to ensure the coherence of the corpus of standardization deliverables. It provides specifications of generic data elements attributes and rules used to define the semantic meaning of any type of information in a predictable way with the aim of supporting multilingual and cultural adaptability requirements from a global perspective.

== Original purpose ==
The ISO 15836 Dublin Core (DC) and the IEEE 1484.12.1-2002 Learning Object Metadata (LOM) are widely used to describe learning resources. However, interoperability among DC data sets is challenging, as best practices are only recommended. Instead of using ISO 8601, a DC Date element can be written in plain language and not processed by queries. Ambiguous definitions pose another challenge as data elements and vocabulary values can be interpreted in a subjective way. For example, the DC Date can be linked to resource creation time, update or publication. In the LOM, the Cost element can only have a “yes” or “no” values. This is also true for LOM records as they are based on a wide variety of Application profiles. The ISO/IEC 19788 standard is intended to provide optimal compatibility with both DC and the LOM and supports multilingual and cultural adaptability requirements from a global perspective. The standard has two primary purposes:

- facilitate the identification and specification of the metadata elements required to describe a learning resource by providing metadata elements and their attributes
- support search, discovery, acquisition, evaluation, and use of learning resources by learners, instructors or automated software processes.

== Data Element Specification (DES) ==
To avoid ambiguity and provide interoperability, metadata learning resources (MLR) data elements are documented using attributes.

Attribute	Usage
Identifier	Sequential numbering of DES within a part. For example, ISO_IEC_19788-2:2011::DES0100 (Title) is the first data element defined in part 2.
Property name	data element name string
Definition	data element definition string
Linguistic indicator	indicates if multiple linguistic equivalents are possible or not
Domain	resource class of items that can be described by the data element, such as Audience or Learning activity
Codomain	can either be a literal (such as a book title) or a resource class (a set of accepted values, such as a list of terms identifiers from a controlled vocabulary list).
Content value rules	rule set attached to the DES, for example the mandatory use of Unicode (ISO/IEC 10646-1:2003)
Refines	indicates if a DES is a refinement of another one. For example, constraining the values to ISO 8601 for the Date Dublin Core data element in a new data element is considered as a refinement of the first one.
Example(s)	optional example(s) of value
Note(s)	optional additional information, such as best practice

== Resource Description Framework Approach ==
The Resource Description Framework is a method for conceptual description of metadata information. Assertions about a learning resource are made using triples (subject, predicate, object) where subject represents the learning resource, predicate is a property identifier and object is the property value.

A MLR triple for the title property of a learning resource
Subject	Predicate	Object
ISBN 0-262-18162-2	ISO_IEC_19788-2:2011::DES0100	Turtle, Termites, and Traffic Jams@en

In a MLR triple, the subject is always the literal of an identifier of the learning resource, such as a URI or ISBN. The predicate is also a literal, the MLR data element specification (DES) identifier. For example, ISO_IEC_19788-2:2011::DES0100 tells us that this DES can be found in part 2 of the standard and DES0100 is the data element used to identify the title of the learning resource. Finally, the object can be a literal (in this example, the book title) or a resource class (a set of accepted values, such as a list of terms identifiers from a controlled vocabulary list).

Computers can easily connect and query linked data structured information. For example, a teacher wishing to annotate a learning resource may do it a single RDFa triple. A repository service could gather all the information about a given learning resource from a wide variety of external sources, providing much richer information than a single provider record.

== Parts description ==
=== Part 1: Framework ===
Provides principles, rules and structures for the specification of the description of a learning resource

=== Part 2: Dublin Core elements ===
Provides a based level made of the 15 data element set for the description of learning resources, from the ISO 15836:2009 The Dublin Core metadata element set, using the framework provided in Part 1.

=== Part 3: Basic application profile ===
Specifies, through adding constraints to the use of some data elements, how the ISO/IEC 19788-2 element set can be used as a starting point for adopting the ISO/IEC 19788 standard.

Part 3 promotes interoperability among repositories. It is expected that users communities will enhance this application profile by adding data elements from other authorities such as IEEE-LOM and Dublin Core extension and by adding vocabulary constrains.

Future editions of this part will likely include additional data element from Parts 4 and beyond such as Technical or Educational data elements.

=== Part 4: Technical elements ===
Provides information in the form of metadata elements about conditions pertaining to the technical requirements, location, and size information

=== Part 5: Educational elements ===
Provides an extensive set of data elements describing the intended or actual use of learning resources across various jurisdictional, cultural and linguistic settings. The description of pedagogical use of a learning resource includes annotations, contributions, curriculum, educational outcome, audience and learning activity.

=== Part 7: Bindings ===
Part 7 provides RDF mappings of the different MLR entities introduced in the MLR framework: Data element specifications, resource classes, data elements, application profiles, MLR records and data element group specifications. It also provides an OWL 2 DL ontology for the resource classes and data element specifications.

=== Part 8: Data elements for MLR records ===
This Part enables the support storage of learning resource description in databases and the exchange of descriptions through harvesting mechanisms. It can be used to keep track of the record editing process including global metadata author identification, last record update and application profile used for the description of a learning resource.

=== Part 9: Data elements for Persons ===
Provides data elements for the description of persons (natural or legal) that are related to the description of a learning resource.

=== Part 11: Migration from LOM to MLR ===
Provides guidance in the form of rules and heuristics for the conversion of an IEEE 1484.12.1-2002 (LOM) record to a MLR data element set.
