= ISO/IEC JTC 1/SC 42 =

ISO standardization subcommittee for artiticial intelligence

ISO/IEC JTC 1/SC 42 — Artificial Intelligence
- Formation: 2018
- Type: Standards organization
- Purpose: Development of worldwide standards for artificial intelligence
- Region served: Worldwide
- Chair: Wael William Diab
- Committee Manager: Heather Benko
- Parent organization: International Organization for Standardization (ISO) and International Electrotechnical Commission (IEC) JTC 1
- Website: jtc1info.org/technology/subcommittees/ai/

ISO/IEC JTC 1/SC 42 Artificial Intelligence is a standardization subcommittee of the Joint Technical Committee ISO/IEC JTC 1 of the International Organization for Standardization (ISO) and the International Electrotechnical Commission (IEC). ISO/IEC JTC 1/SC 42 develops and facilitates the development of international standards, technical reports, and technical specifications within the fields of Artificial Intelligence (AI). The international secretariat of ISO/IEC JTC 1/SC 42 is the American National Standards Institute (ANSI), located in the United States of America. The Chair of SC 42 is Wael William Diab. The first meeting of the committee took place in Beijing, China in April 2018. SC 42 meets face-to-face twice a year in an opening and closing plenary format with its subgroups meeting concurrently during the week. SC 42 organizes bi-annual AI workshops that target all stakeholders interested in AI and the committee's work.

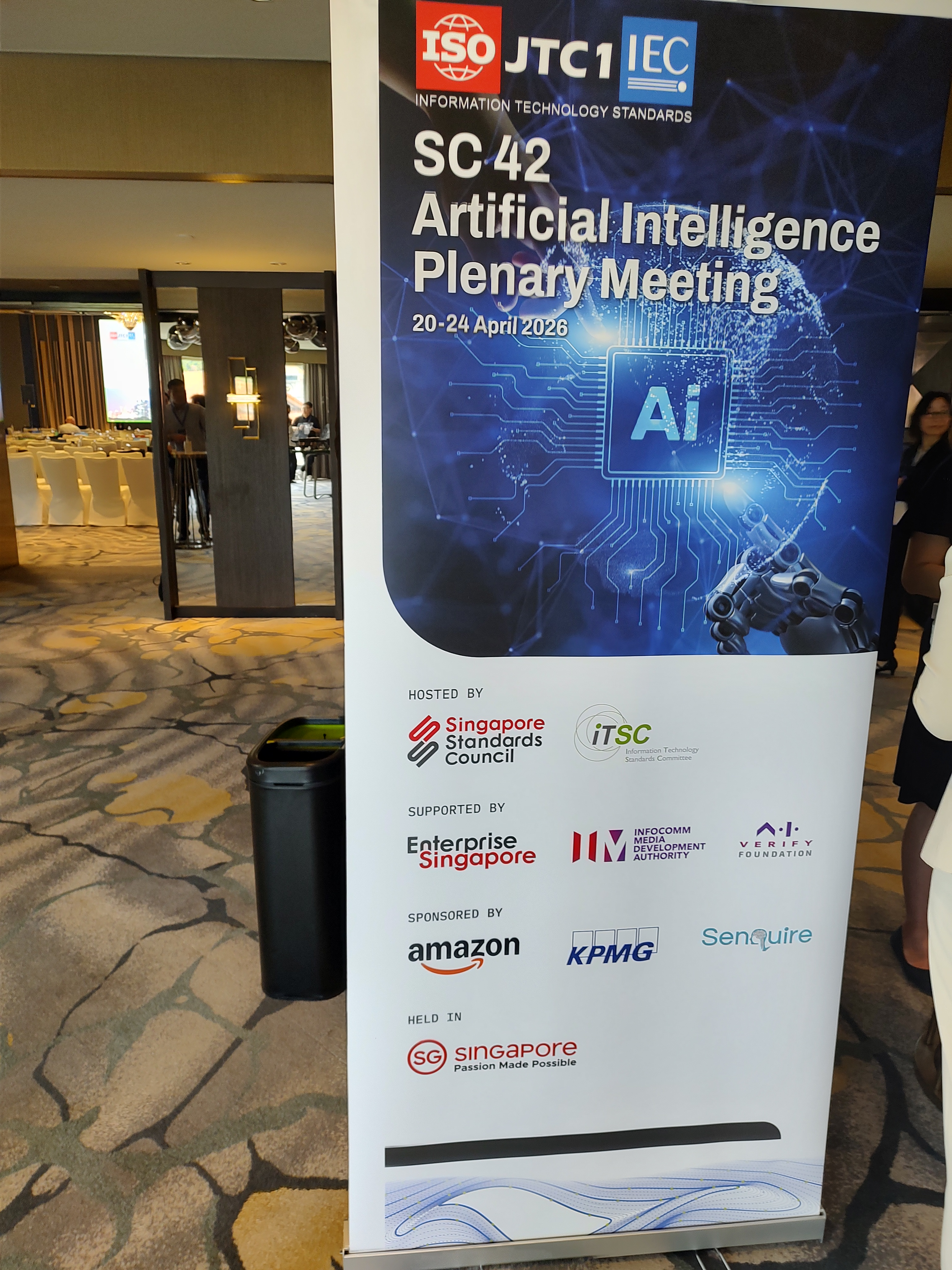

== History ==
At the 32nd ISO/IEC JTC 1 Plenary in Vladivostok, Russia, Resolution 12 established SC 42 as a system integration entity for Artificial Intelligence. The resolution also appointed Mr. Wael William Diab as Chair of the SC and Ms. Heather Benko was appointed as the Committee Manager. The inaugural meeting was held in Beijing, China on April 18th – 20th.

== Scope ==
The scope of ISO/IEC JTC 1/SC 42 is:

- Standardization in the area of Artificial Intelligence
- Serve as the focus and proponent for JTC 1's standardization program on Artificial Intelligence
- Provide guidance to JTC 1, IEC, and ISO committees developing Artificial Intelligence applications

ISO/IEC JTC 1/SC 42 is set up as a Systems Integration Entity.

== Members ==
Membership in SC 42 is open to any national body. A member can be either participating (P) or observing (O). The current list of countries active in SC 42 include:

39 p-members: Australia (SA), Austria (ASI), Azerbaijan (AZSTAND), Belgium (NBN), Canada (SCC), China (SAC), Cyprus (CYS), Democratic Republic of the Congo (OCC), Denmark (DS), Ecuador (INEN), Egypt (EOS), Finland (SFS), France (AFNOR), Germany (DIN), India (BIS), Ireland (NSAI), Israel (SII), Italy (UNI), Japan (JISC), Kazakhstan (KAZMEMST), Korea, Republic of (KATS), Luxembourg (ILNAS), Malaysia (DSM), Malta (MCCAA), Netherlands (NEN), Norway (SN), Philippines (BPS), Portugal (IPQ), Russian Federation (GOST R), Rwanda (RSB), Saudi Arabia (SASO), Singapore (SSC), Slovakia (UNMS SR), Spain (UNE), Sweden (SIS), Switzerland (SNV), Turkey (TSE), Uganda (UNBS), United Kingdom (BSI), United States (ANSI), Zimbabwe (SAZ).

25 o-members

== Structure ==
ISO/IEC JTC 1/SC 42 is currently made up of five working groups, each of which carries out specific tasks in standards development within the field of Artificial Intelligence. The working groups, study groups, and advisory group of ISO/IEC JTC 1/SC 42 are: ISO/IEC JTC 1/SC 42 - Artificial intelligence

Working Group	Title	Convenor
WG 1	Foundational standards	Paul Cotton (Canada)
WG 2	Big Data	David Boyd (United States)
WG 3	Trustworthiness	David Filip (Ireland)
WG 4	Use cases and applications	Fumihiro Maruyama (Japan)
WG 5	Computational approaches and characteristics of artificial intelligence systems	Ning Sun (China)

The subcommittee also administers a number of Joint Work Groups with other subcommittees:

Working Group	Title	Convenor
JWG 2	With ISO/IEC JTC 1/SC 7: Testing of AI-based systems	Adam Leon Smith (UK) and Stuart Reid (UK)
JWG 3	With ISO/TC 215 WG: AI enabled health informatics	Shushaku Tsumoto (Japan)
JWG 4	With IEC/TC 65/SC 65A: Functional safety and AI systems	Riccardo Mariani (Italy)

== Collaborations ==
ISO/IEC JTC 1/SC 42 works in close collaboration with a number of other organizations or subcommittees, both internal and external to ISO and IEC. Organizations internal to ISO or IEC that collaborate with or are in liaison to SC 42 include:

JTC 1 Committees and Groups

- ISO/IEC JTC 1/SC 7, Software and systems engineering
- ISO/IEC JTC 1/SC 27, IT security techniques
- ISO/IEC JTC 1/SC 29, Coding of audio, picture, multimedia and hypermedia information
- ISO/IEC JTC 1/SC 34, Document description and processing languages
- ISO/IEC JTC 1/SC 36, Information technology for learning, education and training
- ISO/IEC JTC 1/SC 38, Distributed application platforms and services (DAPS)
- ISO/IEC JTC 1/SC 39, Sustainability for and by Information Technology
- ISO/IEC JTC 1/SC 40, IT Service Management and IT Governance
- ISO/IEC JTC 1/SC 41, Internet of Things and related technologies
- JTC 1/WG 11 - Smart cities

ISO Committees

- ISO/TC 69, Applications of statistical methods
- ISO/TC 215, Health Informatics
- ISO/TC 299, Robotics
- ISO/TC 307, Blockchain and distributed ledger technologies
- ISO/TC 309, Governance of organizations

IEC Committees

- IEC SyC Smart Cities
- IEC SyC Active Assisted Living
- IEC SyC Smart Manufacturing
- IEC/TC 45A Instrumentation, control and electrical power systems of nuclear facilities
- IEC/TC 56 Dependability
- IEC/TC 62 Medical equipment, software, and systems
- IEC/TC 65 Industrial-process measurement, control and automation
- IEC/TC 65A System aspects
- IEC/TC 100 Audio, video and multimedia systems and equipment

Organizations external to ISO or IEC that collaborate with or are in liaison with SC 42 include:

Category A Liaisons

- Big Data Value AISBL (BDVA)
- Consumers International (CI)
- European Commission (EC)
- European Trade Union Confederation (ETUC)
- Institute of Electrical and Electronics Engineers (IEEE)
- International Telecommunication Union (ITU)
- Open Geospatial Consortium (OGC)
- Small Business Standards (SBS)
- UNESCO
- World Trade Organization (WTO)

ISO/IEC also collaborates with CEN/CENELEC through the Vienna Agreement, specifically with CEN/CENELEC JTC 21, charged with writing standards to support the EU's Artificial Intelligence Act.

== Standards ==
ISO/IEC JTC 1/SC 42 currently has published a number of standards, as well as various other standards or technical reports under development within the field of artificial intelligence. These include:

ISO/IEC Standard	Title	Status
ISO/IEC 5259-1	ISO/IEC 5259-1: Data quality for analytics and machine learning — Part 1: Overview, terminology, and examples	Published (2024)
ISO/IEC 5259-3	ISO/IEC 5259-3: Data quality for analytics and machine learning — Part 3: Data quality management requirements and guidelines	Published (2024)
ISO/IEC 5259-4	ISO/IEC 5259-4: Data quality for analytics and machine learning — Part 4: Data quality process framework	Published (2024)
ISO/IEC 8183	ISO/IEC 8183: Data life cycle framework	Published (2023)
ISO/IEC TS 8200	ISO/IEC TS 8200: Controllability of automated AI systems	Published (2024)
ISO/IEC 17903	ISO/IEC 17903: Overview of machine learning computing devices	Published (2024)
ISO/IEC 20546	ISO/IEC 20546: Big data -- Overview and vocabulary	Published (2019)
ISO/IEC 20547-1	ISO/IEC 20547-1: Big data reference architecture -- Part 1: Framework and application process	Published (2020)
ISO/IEC 20547-2	ISO/IEC TR 20547-2:2018 : Big data reference architecture -- Part 2: Use cases and derived requirements	Published (2018)
ISO/IEC 20547-3	ISO/IEC 20547-3: Big data reference architecture -- Part 3: Reference architecture	Published (2020)
ISO/IEC 20547-5	ISO/IEC TR 20547-5:2018: Big data reference architecture -- Part 5: Standards roadmap	Published (2018)
ISO/IEC 20546	ISO/IEC 20546: Big data -- Overview and vocabulary	Published (2019)
ISO/IEC 22989	ISO/IEC 22989: Artificial Intelligence Concepts and Terminology	Published (2022)
ISO/IEC 23053	ISO/IEC 23053: Framework for Artificial Intelligence (AI) Systems Using Machine Learning (ML)	Published (2022)
ISO/IEC 23894	ISO/IEC 23894: Artificial intelligence - Guidance on risk management	Published (2023)
ISO/IEC TR 24027	ISO/IEC TR 24027: Bias in AI systems and AI aided decision making	Published (2021)
ISO/IEC TR 24028	ISO/IEC TR 24028: Overview of trustworthiness in artificial intelligence	Published (2020)
ISO/IEC TR 24368	ISO/IEC TR 24368: Overview of ethical and societal concerns	Published (2022)
ISO/IEC 24668	ISO/IEC 24668: Process management framework for big data analytics	Published (2022)
ISO/IEC TS 4213	ISO/IEC TS 4213: Assessment of Machine Learning Classification Performance	Published (2022)
ISO/IEC 24029-1	ISO/IEC TR 24029-1: Assessment of the robustness of neural networks — Part 1: Overview	Published (2021)
ISO/IEC 24029-2	ISO/IEC 24029-2: Assessment of the robustness of neural networks — Part 2: Methodology for the use of formal methods	Published (2023)
ISO/IEC 24030	ISO/IEC 24030: AI use cases	Published (2024)
ISO/IEC TS 25058	ISO/IEC TS 25058: Systems and software Quality Requirements and Evaluation (SQuaRE) - Guidance for quality evaluation of AI systems	Published (2024)
ISO/IEC 25059	ISO/IEC 25059: Systems and software Quality Requirements and Evaluation (SQuaRE) - Quality model for AI systems	Published (2023)
ISO/IEC 42001	ISO/IEC 42001: Information technology — Artificial intelligence — Management system	Published (2023)
ISO/IEC 5338	ISO/IEC 5338: AI system life cycle processes	Published (2023)
ISO/IEC 5339	ISO/IEC 5339: Guidance for AI applications	Published (2024)
ISO/IEC 5392	ISO/IEC 5392: Reference architecture of knowledge engineering	Published (2024)
ISO/IEC 5469	ISO/IEC 5469: Functional safety and AI systems	Published (2024)

== Awards ==
In 2023, the ISO/IEC JTC 1/SC 42 has won ISO's Lawrence D. Eicher Award.

== See also ==
- ISO/IEC JTC 1
- List of IEC standards
- List of International Organization for Standardization standards
- American National Standards Institute
- International Electrotechnical Commission
- International Organization for Standardization
