= ISO/IEC JTC 1/WG 7 =

Note: This working group has been disbanded.

ISO/IEC JTC 1/WG 7 Sensor Networks (WGSN) was a standardization working group of the joint technical committee ISO/IEC JTC 1 of the International Organization for Standardization (ISO) and the International Electrotechnical Commission (IEC), which develops and facilitates standards within the field of sensor networks. The international secretariat of ISO/IEC JTC 1/WG 7 is the Korean Agency for Technology and Standards (KATS), located in the Republic of Korea.

Maintenance of the standards was transferred to ISO/IEC JTC 1/SC 41.

== History ==
ISO/IEC JTC 1/WG 7 was established in October 2009 via Resolution 34 of the 24th JTC 1 Plenary in Tel Aviv. The group was established with the intention of creating an ISO/IEC JTC 1 working group that would develop and facilitate the development of international standards for sensor networks. The working group is the successor of ISO/IEC JTC 1/SGSN, Study Group on Sensor Networks, which was established in 2007, at the 22nd JTC 1 Plenary. All standardization activities and members of ISO/IEC JTC 1/SGSN were transferred to ISO/IEC JTC 1/WG 7 after its establishment.

== Terms of reference ==
The terms of reference for ISO/IEC JTC 1/WG 7 are:

- In the area of generic solutions for sensor networks, undertake standardization activities that support and can be applied to the technical work of all relevant JTC 1 entities and to other standards organizations. This includes activities in sensor networks such as the following:”
  - Standardization of terminology
  - Development of a taxonomy
  - Standardization of reference architectures
  - Development of guidelines for interoperability
  - Standardization of specific aspects of sensor networks
- In the area of application – oriented sensor networks, identify gaps and commonalities that may impact standardization activities within the scope of JTC 1. Further, share this information with relevant entities within and outside of JTC 1. Unless better pursued within another JTC 1 entity, the following standardization activities may be pursued as projects by this Working Group:
  - Addressing the technology gaps within the scope of JTC 1 entities
  - Exploiting technology opportunities where it is desirable to provide common approaches to the use of sensor networks across application domains
  - Addressing emerging areas related to M2M and IoT
- In order to foster communication and sharing of information between groups working in the field of sensor networks:
  - Seek liaison relationships with all relevant SCs/WGs
  - Seek liaison relationships with other organizations outside JTC 1
  - Consider the possibility of conducting joint products with relevant ITU-T SGs
  - Seek input from relevant research projects and consortia

== Collaborations ==
ISO/IEC JTC 1/WG 7 works in close collaboration with a number of other organizations or subcommittees, both internal and external to ISO or IEC, in order to avoid conflicting or duplicative work. Organizations internal to ISO or IEC that collaborate with or are in liaison to ISO/IEC JTC 1/WG 7 include:

- ISO/IEC JTC 1/SC 6, Telecommunications and information exchange between systems
- ISO/IEC JTC 1/SC 25, Interconnection of information technology equipment
- ISO/IEC JTC 1/SC 27, IT security techniques
- ISO/IEC JTC 1/SC 31, Automatic identification and data capture techniques
- ISO/IEC JTC 1/SC 32, Data management and interchange
- ISO/IEC JTC 1/SC 36, Information technology for learning, education and training
- ISO/IEC JTC 1/SC 37, Biometrics
- ISO/TC 211, Geographic information/Geomatics
- IEC TC 65, Industrial-process measurement, control and automation
- IEC TC 100, Audio, video and multimedia systems and equipment

Some organizations external to ISO or IEC that collaborate with or are in liaison to ISO/IEC JTC 1/WG 7 include:

- IEEE TC 9, Instrumentation and Measurement Society
- Open Geospatial Consortium (OGC)

== Member countries ==
The 9 members of ISO/IEC JTC 1/WG 7 are: Canada, China, France, Germany, Japan, Republic of Korea, Norway, United Kingdom, and United States.

== Standards ==
ISO/IEC JTC 1/WG 7 currently has a number of standards published or under development within the field of sensor networks, including:

ISO/IEC Standard	Title	Status	Description
ISO/IEC 29182-1	Information technology – Sensor networks: Sensor Network Reference Architecture (SNRA) – Part 1: General overview and requirements	Published (2013)	Provides a general overview of the characteristics of a sensor network and the organization of the entities that comprise such a network
ISO/IEC 29182-2	Information technology – Sensor networks: Sensor Network Reference Architecture (SNRA) – Part 2: Vocabulary and terminology	Published (2013)	Facilitates the development of International Standards in sensor networks by presenting terms and definitions for selected concepts relevant to the field of sensor networks
ISO/IEC 29182-3	Information Technology – Sensor Networks: Sensor Network Reference Architecture (SNRA) – Part 3: Reference architecture views	Published (2014)	“Architecture views including business, operational, systems, and technical views which are presented in functional, logical, and/or physical where applicable”
ISO/IEC 29182-4	Information technology – Sensor networks: Sensor Network Reference Architecture (SNRA) – Part 4: Entity models	Published (2013)	Presents models for the entities that enable sensor network applications and services according to the SNRA
ISO/IEC 29182-5	Information technology – Sensor networks: Sensor Network Reference Architecture (SNRA) – Part 5: Interface definitions	Published (2013)	Provides the definitions and requirements of sensor network interfaces of the entities in the SNRA that covers the following aspects: Interfaces between functional layers to provide service access for the modules in the upper layer to exchange messages with modules in the lower layer; Interfaces between entities introduced in the SNRA enabling sensor network services and applications
ISO/IEC 29182-6	Information Technology – Sensor Networks: Sensor Network Reference Architecture (SNRA) – Part 6: Application Profiles	Published (2014)	Describes: Functional blocks and components of a generic sensor network; Generic sensor network reference architecture incorporating the relevant sensor network-related base standards to support interoperability and data interchange
ISO/IEC 29182-7	Information Technology – Sensor Networks: Sensor Network Reference Architecture (SNRA) – Part 7: Interoperability guidelines	Published (2015)	Provides: An overview of interoperability for heterogeneous sensor networks; Guidelines for interoperability between heterogeneous sensor networks
ISO/IEC 20005	Information technology – Sensor networks – Services and interfaces supporting collaborative information processing in intelligent sensor networks	Published (2013)	Specifies services and interfaces supporting collaborative information processing (CIP) in intelligent sensor networks, which includes: CIP functionalities and CIP functional model; Common services supporting CIP; Common service interfaces to CIP
ISO/IEC 30101	Information technology – Sensor Networks: Sensor Network and its interfaces for smart grid system	Published (2014)	Describes: Interfaces between the sensor networks and other networks; Sensor network architecture to support smart grid systems; Interface between sensor networks with smart grid systems; Sensor network based emerging applications and services to support smart grid systems
ISO/IEC 30128	Information technology – Sensor Networks – Generic Sensor Network Application Interface	Published (2014)	Describes: Generic sensor network applications’ operational requirements; Sensor network capabilities; Mandatory and optional interfaces between the application layers of service providers and sensor network gateways

== See also ==
- ISO/IEC JTC 1
- List of ISO standards
- Korean Agency for Technology and Standards
- International Organization for Standardization
- International Electrotechnical Commission
