= ISO/IEC JTC 1/SC 31 =

ISO/IEC JTC 1/SC 31 Automatic identification and data capture techniques is a subcommittee of the International Organization for Standardization (ISO) and the International Electrotechnical Commission (IEC) Joint Technical Committee (JTC) 1, and was established in 1996. SC 31 develops and facilitates international standards, technical reports, and technical specifications in the field of automatic identification and data capture techniques. The first Plenary established three working groups (WGs): Data Carriers, Data Content, and Conformance. Subsequent Plenaries established other working groups: RFID, RTLS, Mobile Item Identification and Management, Security and File Management, and Applications.

As of 2017, SC 31 has the following working groups:

- WG 1: Data carrier
- WG 2: Data and Structure
- WG 4: Radio communications
- WG 8: Application of AIDC standards

The international secretariat of ISO/IEC JTC 1/SC 31 is the American National Standards Institute (ANSI) located in the United States.

== Scope ==
The scope of ISO/IEC JTC 1/SC 31 is "Standardization of data formats, data syntax, data structures, data encoding, and technologies for the process of automatic identification and data capture and of associated devices utilized in inter-industry applications and international business interchanges and for mobile applications."

== Structure ==
ISO/IEC JTC 1/SC 31 is made up of, and four active working groups (WGs), each of which carries out specific tasks in standards development within the field of automatic identification and data capture techniques. Working groups can be disbanded if the group’s working area is no longer applicable to standardization needs, or established if new working areas arise. The focus of each working group is described in the group’s terms of reference. Active working groups of ISO/IEC JTC 1/SC 31 are:

Working Group	Working Area	Status
ISO/IEC JTC 1/SC 31/WG 1	Data carrier	Active
ISO/IEC JTC 1/SC 31/WG 2	Data and structure	Active
ISO/IEC JTC 1/SC 31/WG 3	Conformance and performance	Disbanded - moved into WG 1 and WG 4
ISO/IEC JTC 1/SC 31/WG 4	Radio communications (RFID, RTLS, Security)	Active
ISO/IEC JTC 1/SC 31/WG 5	Real time location systems	Disbanded - moved into WG 4
ISO/IEC JTC 1/SC 31/WG 6	Mobile item identification and management	Disbanded - moved into WG 2 and WG 4
ISO/IEC JTC 1/SC 31/WG 7	Security and file management	Disbanded - moved into WG 4
ISO/IEC JTC 1/SC 31/WG 8	Application of AIDC standards	Active

== Collaborations ==
ISO/IEC JTC 1/SC 31 works in close collaboration with a number of other organizations or subcommittees, both internal and external to ISO or IEC, in order to avoid conflicting or duplicative work. Organizations internal to ISO or IEC that collaborate with or are in liaison to ISO/IEC JTC 1/SC 31 include:

- ISO/IEC JTC 1/SC 6, Telecommunications and information exchange between systems
- ISO/IEC JTC 1/SC 17, Cards and personal identification
- ISO/IEC JTC 1/SC 17/WG 8, Integrated circuit cards without contacts
- ISO/IEC JTC 1/SC 27, IT security techniques
- ISO/IEC JTC 1/SC 37, Biometrics
- ISO/IEC JTC 1/SC 41, Internet of Things and related technologies
- ISO/PC 246, Anti-counterfeiting tools
- ISO/TC 104, Freight containers
- ISO/TC 122, Packaging
- ISO/TC 184/SC 4, Industrial data
- ISO/TC 204, Intelligent transportation system
- ISO/TC 247, Fraud countermeasures and controls

Some organizations external to ISO or IEC that collaborate with or are in liaison to ISO/IEC JTC 1/SC 31, include:

- AIM Global Inc., Association for automatic identification and mobility
- CENELEC TC 106X, electromagnetic fields in the human environment
- CEN/TC 225, AIDC technologies
- CEN/TC 310, Advanced manufacturing technologies
- CEN/TC 331, Postal services
- Ecma International
- European Telecommunications Standards Institute (ETSI)
- International Air Transport Association (IATA)
- Institute of Electrical and Electronics Engineers, (IEEE)
- ITU
- GS1, GS1 Global Office/EPC Global
- Universal Postal Union (UPU)

== Member countries ==
Countries pay a fee to ISO to be members of subcommittees. The 31 "P" (participating) members of ISO/IEC JTC 1/SC 31 are: Australia, Austria, Belgium, Brazil, Canada, China, Colombia, Czech Republic, Denmark, France, Germany, India, Ireland, Israel, Japan, Kenya, Republic of Korea, Malaysia, Netherlands, Peru, Philippines, Russian Federation, Singapore, Slovakia, South Africa, Spain, Sweden, Switzerland, United Kingdom, and United States.

The 12 "O" (observer) members of ISO/IEC JTC 1/SC 31 are: Bosnia and Herzegovina, Finland, Ghana, Hong Kong, Hungary, Indonesia, Islamic Republic of Iran, Italy, Kazakhstan, Luxembourg, New Zealand, Romania, Serbia, and Thailand.

== Standards ==
ISO/IEC JTC 1/SC 31 currently has 107 published standards within the field of automatic identification and data capture, including:

ISO/IEC Standard	Title	Status	Description	WG
ISO/IEC 15417	Information technology – Automatic identification and data capture techniques – Code 128 bar code symbology specification	Published (2007)	"Specifies the requirements for the bar code symbology known as Code 128: symbology characteristics, data character encodation, dimensions, decoding algorithms and the parameters to be defined by applications."	1
ISO/IEC 15420	Information technology – Automatic identification and data capture techniques – EAN/UPC bar code symbology specification	Published (2025)	"Specifies the requirements for the bar code symbology known as EAN/UPC; for use by manufacturers of bar code equipment and users of bar code technology."	1
ISO/IEC 15438	Information technology – Automatic identification and data capture techniques – PDF417 bar code symbology specification	Published (2015)	"Specifies the requirements for the bar code symbology known as PDF417: symbology characteristics, data character encodation, symbol formats, dimensions, error correction rules, reference decoding algorithm, and a number of application parameters."	1
ISO/IEC 16022	Information technology – Automatic identification and data capture techniques – Data Matrix bar code symbology specification	Published (2024)	"Defines the requirements for the symbology known as Data Matrix: the symbology characteristics, data character encodation, symbol formats, dimensions and print quality requirements, error correction rules, decoding algorithm, and user-selectable application parameters."	1
ISO/IEC 16388	Information technology – Automatic identification and data capture techniques – Code 39 bar code symbology specification	Published (2023)	"Specifies the requirements for the bar code symbology known as Code 39: symbology characteristics, data character encodation, dimensions, tolerances, decoding algorithms and parameters to be defined by applications."	1
ISO/IEC 16390	Information technology – Automatic identification and data capture – Interleaved 2 of 5 bar code symbology specification	Published (2007)	"Specifies the requirements for the bar code symbology known as Interleaved 2 of 5: symbology characteristics, data character encodation, dimensions, tolerances, decoding algorithms and parameters to be defined by applications."	1
ISO/IEC 18004	Information technology – Automatic identification and data capture techniques – QR Code bar code symbology specification	Published (2024)	"Specifies requirements for the symbology known as QR Code: the symbology characteristics, data character encoding methods, symbol formats, dimensional characteristics, error correction rules, reference decoding algorithm, production quality requirements and user-selectable application parameters."	1
ISO/IEC 21471	Information technology – Automatic identification and data capture techniques – Data Matrix Rectangular Extension (DMRE) bar code symbology specification	Published (2025)	"Defines the requirements for the symbology known as Data Matrix Rectangular Extension (DMRE): the symbology characteristics, data character encodation, symbol formats, dimensions and print quality requirements, error correction rules, decoding algorithm, and user-selectable application parameters."	1
ISO/IEC 23941	Information technology – Automatic identification and data capture techniques – Rectangular Micro QR Code (rMQR) bar code symbology specification	Published (2022)	"Defines the requirements for the symbology known as rMQR: the symbology characteristics, data character encoding methods, symbol formats, dimensional characteristics, error correction rules, reference decoding algorithm, printing quality requirements and user-selectable application parameters."	1
ISO/IEC 24728	Information technology – Automatic identification and data capture techniques – MicroPDF417 bar code symbology specification	Published (2006)	"Specifies the requirements for the bar code symbology known as MicroPDF417, and specifies its symbology characteristics, data character encodation, symbol formats, dimensions, error correction rules, decoding algorithm, and a number of application parameters."	1
ISO/IEC 24778	Information technology – Automatic identification and data capture techniques – Aztec Code bar code symbology specification	Published (2024)	"Defines the requirements & characteristics for the symbology known as Aztec Code: data character encodation, rules for error control encoding, the graphical symbol structure, symbol dimensions and print quality requirements, a reference decoding algorithm & user-selectable application parameters."	1
ISO/IEC 15434	Information technology – Automatic identification and data capture techniques – Syntax for high-capacity ADC media	Published (2025)	"Specifies a transfer structure, syntax, coding of messages and data formats when using high-capacity automatic data capture (ADC) media."	2
ISO/IEC 15459	Information technology – Automatic identification and data capture techniques – Unique identification – Part 1 Individual transport units	Published (2006)	"Specifies a unique, non-significant string of characters for the identification of transport units. The character string is intended to be represented in a bar code label or other AIDC media attached to the item to meet item management needs. To address management needs, different classes of items are recognized in the various parts of ISO/IEC 15459, which allows different requirements to be met by the unique identifiers associated with each class. The rules for the unique identifier for transport units, to identify physical logistical transfers, with the identity relevant for the duration of one or more items in the load being held or transported as part of that load, are defined and supported by an example."	2
ISO/IEC 15418	Information technology – Automatic identification and data capture techniques – GS1 Application Identifiers and ASC MH10 Data Identifiers and maintenance	Published (2009)	"Specifies sets of Data Identifiers and Application Identifiers for the purpose of identifying encoded data, and identifies the organizations responsible for their maintenance."	2
ISO/IEC 20248	Automatic Identification and Data Capture Techniques – Data Structures – Digital Signature Meta Structure	Published as SANS 1368, ISO/IEC draft under development	"Specifies a method whereby data stored within a barcode and/or RFID tag is structured and digitally signed. The purpose of the standard is to provide an open and interoperable method, between services and data carriers, to verify data originality and data integrity in an offline use case."	2
ISO/IEC 15961-1	Information technology – Radio-frequency identification (RFID) for item management: Data protocol – Part 1: Application interface	Published (2013)	"Provides guidelines on how data shall be presented as objects; "Defines the structure of Object Identifiers; "Specifies the commands that are supported for transferring data between an application and the RFID tag; "Specifies the responses that are supported for transferring data between the RFID tag and the application"	4
ISO/IEC 15963	Information technology – Radio frequency identification for item management – Unique identification for RF tags	Published (2009)	Describes numbering systems that are available for the identification RF tags	4
ISO/IEC 18000	Information technology – Radio frequency identification for item management –	Published (2008)	The various parts of ISO/IEC 18000 describe air interface communication at different frequencies in order to be able to utilize the different physical behaviors. The various parts of ISO/IEC 18000 are developed by ISO/IEC JTC1 SC31, "Automatic Data Capture Techniques."	4
ISO/IEC 18046	Information technology – Radio frequency identification device performance test methods – Part 1: Test methods for system performance	Published (2011)	"Defines test methods for the performance characteristics of RFID systems for item management; specifies the general requirements and test requirements for systems which are applicable to the selection of devices for an application."	4
ISO/IEC 24730-61	Information technology—Real time locating systems (RTLS) -- Part 61: Low rate pulse repetition frequency Ultra Wide Band (UWB) air interface	Published (2013)	"Defines the physical layer (PHY) and tag management layer (TML) of an ultra wide band (UWB) air interface protocol that supports one directional simplex communication readers and tags of a real time locating system (RTLS). This protocol is best utilized for low-data-rate wireless connectivity with fixed, portable, and moving devices with very limited battery consumption requirements."	
ISO/IEC 24730-62	Information technology—Real time locating systems (RTLS) -- Part 62: High rate pulse repetition frequency Ultra Wide Band (UWB) air interface	Published (2013)	"Defines the air-interface for real time locating systems (RTLS) using a physical layer Ultra Wide Band (UWB) signalling mechanism (based on IEEE 802.15.4a UWB). This modulation scheme employs high rate pulse repetition frequencies (PRF) 16 MHz or 64 MHz, and a combination of burst position modulation (BPM) and binary phase-shift keying (BPSK) giving an extremely high level of performance with a fully coherent receiver."	
ISO/IEC 29143	Information technology—Real time locating systems (RTLS) -- Part 62: High rate pulse repetition frequency Ultra Wide Band (UWB) air interface	Published (2013)	"Defines the air-interface for real time locating systems (RTLS) using a physical layer Ultra Wide Band (UWB) signalling mechanism (based on IEEE 802.15.4a UWB). This modulation scheme employs high rate pulse repetition frequencies (PRF) 16 MHz or 64 MHz, and a combination of burst position modulation (BPM) and binary phase-shift keying (BPSK) giving an extremely high level of performance with a fully coherent receiver."	
ISO/IEC 29143	Information technology – Automatic identification and data capture techniques – Air interface specification for Mobile RFID interrogators	Published (2011)	Provides an air interface specification for Mobile RFID interrogators being part of a passive backscatter system	6
ISO/IEC/IEEE 21451-1	Information technology – Smart transducer interface for sensors and actuators – Part 1: Network Capable Application Processor (NCAP) information model	Published (2010)	"Defines an object model with a network-neutral interface for connecting processors to communication networks, sensors, and actuators."	6
ISO/IEC 29167-1	Information technology – Automatic identification and data capture techniques – Part 1: Air interface for security services and file	Published (2012)	"Defines the architecture for security and file management for the ISO/IEC 18000 air interface standards for RFID devices, and extends the air interface through the definition of architecture for: Untraceability; Security services"	7

Standards currently under development by ISO/IEC JTC 1/SC 31 include standards for Optical Character Recognition (OCR) by ISO/IEC JTC 1/SC W31/WG 1, standards for bar code symbols on mobile phone displays, and reading and display of ORM by mobile devices.

== See also ==
- ISO/IEC JTC 1
- American National Standards Institute
- International Organization for Standardization
- International Electrotechnical Commission
