= ISO/IEC JTC 1/SWG-A =

Note: This special working group has been disbanded.

ISO/IEC JTC 1/SWG on Accessibility (SWG-A) was a special working group of the Joint Technical Committee ISO/IEC JTC 1 of the International Organization for Standardization (ISO) and the International Electrotechnical Commission (IEC) that promoted and facilitated standards development within the field of information and communications technology (ICT) accessibility. ISO/IEC JTC 1/SWG-A was formed at the October 2004 ISO/IEC JTC 1 Plenary Meeting in Berlin, Germany via approval of Resolution 24.

After completing its goals by publishing ISO/IEC TR 29138 Parts 1, 2 and 3, it was dissolved. Maintenance of the standards was transferred to ISO/IEC JTC 1/SC 35.

The special working group was created as a response to the standardization demands regionally, locally, and globally, in the field of ICT for accessibility. The international secretariat of ISO/IEC JTC 1/SWG-A is administered by ITI/INCITS acting on behalf of the American National Standards Institute (ANSI), located in the United States. The first meeting of the special working group took place in Sheffield, United Kingdom in April 2005, where the group’s terms of reference were confirmed and its original two task groups established.

== Terms of reference ==
The terms of reference for ISO/IEC JTC 1/SWG-A are:

- Determine an approach to, and implement, the gathering of accessibility‐related information, being mindful of the varied and unique opportunities including direct participation of user organizations, workshops, and liaisons
- Maintain and disseminate up‐to‐date information of all known accessibility‐related standards efforts, i.e. the standards inventory
- Maintain and disseminate up‐to‐date information on accessibility‐related user needs, i.e. the user needs summary
- Through wide dissemination of the SWG materials, encourage the use of globally relevant voluntary accessibility‐related standards
- Together with PAS mentors, advise consortia/fora, if requested, in their submission of accessibility‐related standards/specifications to the formal standards process
- Provide support when JTC 1 needs assistance related to accessibility (such as duties for WSC Accessibility Strategic Advisory Group and input on accessible ISO web content)

== Structure ==
ISO/IEC JTC 1/SWG-A is made up of four active Ad Hoc groups, each of which carries out specific tasks within the field of accessibility. The four active Ad Hoc groups of ISO/IEC JTC 1/SWG-A are:

Ad Hoc	Working Area
Ad Hoc 14	Accessibility User Needs Summary
Ad Hoc 15	Evolution of Database Definition for the Accessibility Standards Inventory
Ad Hoc 16	Guidance for Accessible Production of Documents in Accessible Formats
Ad Hoc 17	Individualization/Personalization for or Related to Accessibility

== Collaborations ==
ISO/IEC JTC 1/SWG-A works in close collaboration with a number of other organizations or subcommittees, both internal and external to ISO or IEC. Organizations internal to ISO or IEC that collaborate with or are in liaison to ISO/IEC JTC 1/SWG-A include:

- ISO/IEC JTC 1/SC 7, Software and systems engineering
- ISO/IEC JTC 1/SC 29, Coding of audio, picture, multimedia and hypermedia information
- ISO/IEC JTC 1/SC 35, User interfaces
- ISO/IEC JTC 1/SC 36, Information technology for learning, education and training
- ISO/TC 159, Ergonomics
- IEC TC 100, Audio, video and multimedia systems and equipment

Organizations external to ISO or IEC that collaborate with or are in liaison to ISO/IEC JTC 1/SWG-A include:

- ITU-T SG 16, Multimedia
- ITU-T FG AVA, Audiovisual Media Accessibility
- The Linux Foundation
- W3C Web Accessibility Initiative (WAI)

There are also a number of consumer organizations, user representatives, and other interested parties that are involved with ISO/IEC JTC 1/SWG-A, such as:

- American Foundation for the Blind (AFB) Tech
- Altarum Institute/Accessibility Forum
- ANEC
- Japanese Society for Rehabilitation of Persons with Disabilities (via the Japanese National Body)
- Japanese Industrial Standards (JIS) Committee on Web Accessibility
- Royal National Institute of the Blind (via the UK National Body)
- United States Access Board
- United States Department of Education
- University of Wisconsin (Trace R&D Center)
- Visual Impairment Knowledge Center
- WGBH National Centre for Accessible Media

== Member countries ==
The members of ISO/IEC JTC 1/SWG-A are: Australia, Canada, Denmark, France, Germany, Italy, Japan, The Netherlands, Norway, The Republic of Korea, United Kingdom, and United States of America.

== Publications ==
ISO/IEC JTC 1/SWG-A has a number of publications in the field of ICT accessibility, including:

Title	Status	Description
ISO/IEC TR 29138-1: Information technology – Accessibility considerations for people with disabilities – Part 1: User needs summary	Published (2009)	Identifies a collection of user needs of people with disabilities that can be taken into consideration by standards developers when developing/revising standards
ISO/IEC TR 29138-2: Information technology – Accessibility considerations for people with disabilities – Part 2: Standards inventory	Published (2009)	Identifies a collection of standards that provides guidance to meet the needs of people with disabilities. The updated version is available as “The inventory of Accessibility and Accessibility-related Standards and Specifications”
The inventory of Accessibility and Accessibility-related Standards and Specifications	Published (2013)	Expands and evolves ISO/IEC TR 29138-2:2009
ISO/IEC TR 29138-3: Information technology – Accessibility considerations for people with disabilities – Part 3: Guidance on user needs mapping	Published (2009)	“Provides guidance on the mapping of the set of user needs with the provisions of a particular standard, technical report, or set of guidelines.”

== Dissolution ==
In a resolution adopted at the 29th meeting of ISO/IEC JTC 1 in November 2014, ISO/IEC JTC 1/SWG-A was disbanded. This special working group completed the tasks for which it was originally established with the publication of ISO/IEC TR 29138 Parts 1, 2 and 3. Part 2 of this document has been transitioned from a technical report to ISO/IEC JTC 1 publication, The Inventory of Accessibility and Accessibility-related Standards and Specifications, which is available on the ISO Online Browsing Platform (OBP). With the dissolution of ISO/IEC JTC 1/SWG-A, JTC 1 has transferred responsibility for the maintenance of The Inventory of Accessibility and Accessibility-related Standards and Specifications to ISO/IEC JTC 1/SC 35. All relevant ISO/IEC JTC 1/SWG-A documents were submitted to the ISO/IEC JTC 1 Secretariat for archiving and all liaisons and members were informed of the dissolution.

== See also ==
- ISO/IEC JTC 1
- International Committee for Information Technology Standards
- Information Technology Industry Council
- American National Standards Institute
- International Organization for Standardization
- International Electrotechnical Commission
- List of ISO standards
