= IEC TC 25 =

IEC Technical Committee 25, "Quantities and units, and their letter symbols", was established in 1935. It is one of the technical committees of the International Electrotechnical Commission (IEC).

It merged with TC 24 and as a committee with "horizontal" responsibilities (i.e. covering matters of a wide-ranging nature and applicable by many “vertical” or product-oriented committees), it is in charge of all questions concerning the SI.

Among other standards it is responsible for parts 6, 13, 14, 15, 16, 17 of ISO/IEC 80000.

== See also ==
- List of IEC technical committees
