= ISO/IEC JTC 1/SC 35 =

Standardisation subcommittee for computing

ISO/IEC JTC 1/SC 35 User interfaces is a standardization subcommittee (SC), which is part of the joint technical committee, ISO/IEC JTC 1, of the International Organization for Standardization (ISO) and the International Electrotechnical Commission (IEC), that develops standards within the field of user-system interfaces in information and communication technology (ICT) environments. The subcommittee was founded at the 1998 Sendai ISO/IEC JTC 1 Plenary meeting, before which it was a working group directly under ISO/IEC JTC 1 (ISO/IEC JTC 1/WG 5). The international secretariat of ISO/IEC JTC 1/SC 35 is AFNOR (Association Française de Normalisation), located in France.

== Scope and mission ==
The scope of ISO/IEC JTC 1/SC 35 is “Standardization in the field of user-system interfaces in information and communication technology (ICT) environments and support for these interfaces to serve all users, including people having accessibility or other specific needs, with a priority of meeting the JTC 1 requirements for cultural and linguistic adaptability,” including:

- User interface accessibility (requirements, needs, methods, techniques and enablers)
- Cultural and linguistic adaptability and accessibility (such as evaluation of cultural and linguistic adaptability of ICT products, harmonized human language equivalents, localization parameters, voice messaging menus, etc.)
- User interface objects, actions and attributes
- Methods and technologies for controlling and navigating within systems, devices and applications in visual, auditory, tactile and other sensorial modalities (such as by voice, vision, movement, gestures, etc.)
- Symbols, functionality and interactions of user interfaces (such as graphical, tactile and auditory icons, graphical symbols and other user interface elements)
- Visual, auditory, tactile and other sensorial input and output devices and methods in ICT environments (for devices such as keyboards, displays, mice, etc.)
- User interfaces for mobile devices, hand-held devices and remote interactions

== Structure ==
ISO/IEC JTC 1/SC 35 is made up of seven active working groups (WGs), each of which carries out specific tasks in standards development within the field of user interfaces, where the focus of each working group is described in the group’s terms of reference. The seven active working groups of ISO/IEC JTC 1/SC 35 are:

| Working group | Working area |
|---|---|
| ISO/IEC JTC 1/SC 35/WG 1 | Keyboards and input interfaces |
| ISO/IEC JTC 1/SC 35/WG 2 | Graphical user interface and interaction |
| ISO/IEC JTC 1/SC 35/WG 4 | User interfaces for mobile devices |
| ISO/IEC JTC 1/SC 35/WG 5 | Cultural and linguistic adaptability |
| ISO/IEC JTC 1/SC 35/WG 6 | User interfaces accessibility |
| ISO/IEC JTC 1/SC 35/WG 7 | User interfaces object, actions and attributes |
| ISO/IEC JTC 1/SC 35/WG 9 | Natural user interfaces and interactions |

== Collaborations ==
ISO/IEC JTC 1/SC 35 works in close collaboration with a number of other organizations or subcommittees, both internal and external to ISO or IEC, in order to boost synergies and share know-how but also to avoid conflicting or duplicative work. Organizations internal to ISO or IEC that collaborate with or are in liaison to ISO/IEC JTC 1/SC 35 include:

- ISO/IEC JTC 1/SC 2, Coded character sets
- ISO/IEC JTC 1/SC 36, Information technology for learning, education and training
- ISO/TC 159, Ergonomics
- ISO/TC 159/SC 4, Ergonomics of human system Interaction - Software ergonomics and human - computer dialogues
- ISO/TC 145, Graphical symbols
- IEC TC/SC 3C, Information structures, documentation and graphical symbols
- JWG 11 ISO/TC 145–IEC/SC 3C, Joint working group ISO/TC 145-IEC/SC 3C

Organizations external to ISO or IEC that collaborate with, or are in liaison to, ISO/IEC JTC 1/SC 35 include:

- World Wide Web Consortium (W3C)

== Member Countries ==
Countries pay a fee to ISO to be members of subcommittees. The 19 "P" (Participating) members of ISO/IEC JTC 1/SC 35 are: Canada, China, Denmark, Finland, France, Germany, Greece, India, Italy, Japan, Republic of Korea, Russian Federation, South Africa, Spain, Sweden, Switzerland, Ukraine, United Kingdom, and United States. The 17 "O" (Observer) members of ISO/IEC JTC 1/SC 35 are: Austria, Belgium, Bosnia and Herzegovina, Bulgaria, Czech Republic, Ghana, Hungary, Indonesia, Islamic Republic of Iran, Ireland, Israel, Kenya, Netherlands, New Zealand, Poland, Romania, and Serbia .

== Published standards ==
As of 2013, ISO/IEC JTC 1/SC 35 has 51 published standards within the field of user interfaces, including:

| ISO/IEC standard | Title | Status | Description | WG |
|---|---|---|---|---|
| ISO/IEC 9995-1 … 9995-11 | Information technology – Keyboard layouts for text and office systems | Published (1994–2015) | The series defines a framework for the layout of all alphanumeric and numeric keyboards across today’s and upcoming applications using keyboards | 1 |
| ISO/IEC 13251 | Collection of graphical symbols for office equipment | Published (2004) | Provides a certain number of graphical symbols that are commonly used on office equipment such as printers, computers, telephones, and copying machines | 2 |
| ISO/IEC 14754 | Information technology – Pen-Based Interfaces – Common gestures for Text Editing with Pen-Based Systems | Published (1999) | Defines the basic gesture commands for text editing with pen-based systems and defines the user actions required to have the system execute these commands. | 4 |
| ISO/IEC 15897 | Information technology – User interfaces – Procedures for the registration of cultural elements | Published (2011) | Specifies the information that can appear in a Cultural Specification and defines the procedures for registering such specifications. | 5 |
| ISO/IEC TR 30112 | Information technology – User interfaces – Procedures for the registration of cultural elements | Published (2014) | Specifies description formats and functionality for the specification of cultural conventions, description formats for character sets, and description formats for binding character names to ISO/IEC 10646, plus a set of default values for some of these items. | 5 |
| ISO/IEC TR 19764 | Information technology – Guidelines, methodology and reference criteria for cultural and linguistic adaptability in information technology products | Published (2005) | Defines a methodology and a guided checklist for evaluation and cultural adaptability in software, hardware, and other IT products. | 5 |
| ISO/IEC TR 24785 | Information technology—Taxonomy of cultural and linguistic adaptability user requirements | Published (2007) | Defines a taxonomy describing the various elements of cultural and linguistic adaptability user requirements for use in a computer environment. | 5 |
| ISO/IEC TR 19765 | Information technology – Survey of icons and symbols that provide access to functions and facilities to improve the use of information technology products by the elderly and persons with disabilities | Published (2007) | Presents icons and symbols currently in use to provide access to the facilities and tools needed to better support the needs of elderly and disabled users of IT products | 6 |
| ISO/IEC 24786 | Information technology—User interfaces—Accessible user interface for accessibility settings | Published (2009) | Specifies requirements and recommendations for making accessibility settings accessible. Provides guidance on specific accessibility settings. It specifies how to access and operate the accessibility setting mode, and how to directly activate specific accessibility functions. | 6 |
| ISO/IEC 29136 | Information technology—User interfaces—Accessibility of personal computer hardware | Published (2012) | Provides requirements and recommendations for the accessibility of personal computer hardware, to be used when planning, developing, designing and distributing these computers. Addresses connectivity of assistive technologies as an integrated component of interactive systems. | 6 |
| ISO/IEC 13066-1 | Information technology—Interoperability with assistive technology (AT) -- Part 1: Requirements and recommendations for interoperability | Published (2011) | The series provides a basis for designing and evaluating interoperability between IT and AT, formalizes the layered architecture of hardware-to-hardware, hardware-to-software, and software-to-software connections. It also recognizes the central role that accessibility application programming interfaces (accessibility APIs) play in aiding this interoperability, and identifies a variety of common accessibility APIs that are described further in individual parts of ISO/IEC 13066. | 6 |
| ISO/IEC 20071-11 | Information technology—User interface component accessibility—Part 11: Guidance for alternative text for images | Published (2012) | This series provides guidance for the creation of alternatives to content that may not be accessible to persons in some situations, e.g. text alternative for images, audio-described content for audiovisual contents. | 6 |
| ISO/IEC TR 11580 | Information technology – Framework for describing user interface objects, actions and attributes | Published (2007) | Defines a format for describing user interface objects, actions, and attributes | 7 |
| ISO/IEC 24752-1 | Information technology – User interfaces – Universal remote console – Part 1: Framework | Published (2014) | The series “facilitates operation of information and electronic products through remote and alternative interfaces and intelligent agents.” | 8 |

== See also ==
- ISO/IEC JTC 1
- AFNOR
- International Organization for Standardization
- International Electrotechnical Commission
