= ISO/IEC JTC 1 =

Joint technical committee of the ISO and IEC

ISO/IEC JTC 1 — Information Technology
- Formation: 1987
- Type: Standards organization
- Purpose: Development of worldwide information and communications technology (ICT) standards for business and consumer applications
- Location: Washington, D.C.
- Region served: Worldwide
- Chairman: Phil Wennblom
- Parent organization: International Organization for Standardization (ISO) and International Electrotechnical Commission (IEC)
- Website: jtc1info.org

ISO/IEC JTC 1, entitled "Information technology", is a joint technical committee (JTC) of the International Organization for Standardization (ISO) and the International Electrotechnical Commission (IEC). Its purpose is to develop, maintain and promote standards in the fields of information and communications technology (ICT).

JTC 1 has been responsible for many critical IT standards, ranging from the Joint Photographic Experts Group (JPEG) image formats and Moving Picture Experts Group (MPEG) audio and video formats (Note: The JPEG and MPEG work is in the ISO/IEC JTC 1/SC 29 subcommittee, entitled "Coding of audio, picture, multimedia and hypermedia information".) to the C and C++ programming languages. (Note: C and C++ is standardized in the ISO/IEC JTC 1/SC 22 subcommittee entitled "Programming languages, their environments and system software interfaces", within which working group 14 is responsible for C and 21 is responsible for C++.)

== History ==
ISO/IEC JTC 1 was formed in 1987 as a merger between ISO/TC 97 (Information Technology) and IEC/TC 83, with IEC/SC 47B joining later. The intent was to bring together, in a single committee, the IT standardization activities of the two parent organizations in order to avoid duplicative or possibly incompatible standards. At the time of its formation, the mandate of JTC 1 was to develop base standards in information technology upon which other technical committees could build. This would allow for the development of domain and application-specific standards that could be applicable to specific business domains while also ensuring the interoperation and function of the standards on a consistent base.

In its first 15 years, JTC 1 brought about many standards in the information technology sector, including standards in the fields of multimedia (such as MPEG), IC cards (or "smart cards"), ICT security, programming languages, and character sets (such as the Universal Character Set). In the early 2000s, the organization expanded its standards development into fields such as security and authentication, bandwidth/connection management, storage and data management, software and systems engineering, service protocols, portable computing devices, and certain societal aspects such as data protection and cultural and linguistic adaptability.

For more than 25 years, JTC 1 has provided a standards development environment where experts come together to develop worldwide Information and Communication Technology (ICT) standards for business and consumer applications. JTC 1 also addresses such critical areas as teleconferencing and e-meetings, cloud data management interface, biometrics in identity management, sensor networks for smart grid systems, and corporate governance of ICT implementation. As technologies converge, JTC 1 acts as a system integrator, especially in areas of standardization in which many consortia and forums are active. JTC 1 provides the standards approval environment for integrating diverse and complex ICT technologies. These standards rely upon the core infrastructure technologies developed by JTC 1 centers of expertise complemented by specifications developed in other organizations. There are over 2,800 published JTC 1 standards developed by about 2,100 technical experts from around the world, some of which are freely available for download while others are available for a fee.

=== Leadership ===
In 2008, Ms. Karen Higginbottom of HP was elected as chair. In a 2013 interview, she described priorities, including cloud computing standards and adaptations of existing standards. After Higginbottom's nine-year term expired in 2017, Mr. Phil Wennblom of Intel was elected as chair at the JTC 1 Plenary meeting in Vladivostok, Russia.

== PAS transposition process ==
JTC 1 has implemented a process to transpose "publicly available specifications" (PAS) into international ISO/IEC standards. The PAS transposition process allows a PAS to be approved as an ISO/IEC standard in less than a year, as opposed to a full length process that can take up to 4 years. Consortia, such as OASIS, Trusted Computing Group (TCG), The Open Group, Object Management Group (OMG), W3C, Distributed Management Task Force (DMTF), Storage Networking Industry Association (SNIA), Open Geospatial Consortium (OGC), GS1, Spice User Group, Open Connectivity Foundation (OCF), NESMA, Society of Motion Picture and Television Engineers (SMPTE), Khronos Group, or Joint Development Foundation use this process to transpose their specifications in an efficient manner into ISO/IEC standards.

== Scope and mission ==
The scope of ISO/IEC JTC 1 is "International standardization in the field of information technology". Its official mandate is to develop, maintain, promote and facilitate IT standards required by global markets meeting business and user requirements concerning:

- The design and development of IT systems and tools
- The performance and quality of IT products and systems
- The security of IT systems and information
- The portability of application programs
- The interoperability of IT products and systems
- The unified tools and environments
- The harmonized IT vocabulary
- The user-friendly and ergonomically-designed user interfaces

== Guiding principles ==
JTC 1 has a number of principles that guide standards development within the organization, which include:

- Standards development conducted with full attention to a strong business-like approach (e.g., cost effective, short development times, market-oriented results)
- Providing a wide range of quality products and services within the JTC 1 scope and mission to cover identified global needs
- Promoting the use of its products and services and the timely implementation of JTC 1 standards within the form of useful products on a worldwide basis
- Ensuring that its user needs, including multicultural requirements, are fully met, such that its products and services promote international trade
- Recognizing the value of the work of other organizations and the contribution they make to international IT standardization and complementing existing and forthcoming JTC 1 programs through other leading edge activity with the objective of providing the best standards worldwide
- Providing a standards development environment that attracts technical experts and users having identified standardization needs

== Members ==
Like its ISO and IEC parent organizations, members of JTC 1 are national standards bodies. One national standards body represents each member country, and the members are referred to within JTC 1 as "national bodies" (NBs). A member can either have participating (P-member) or observing (O-member) status, with the main differences being the ability to participate at the working group level in the drafting of standards and to vote on proposed standards (although O-members may submit comments). As of May 2021, JTC 1 has 35 P-members and 65 O-members, and thus 100 member NBs. The secretariat of JTC 1 is the American National Standards Institute (ANSI), which is the national standards body for the United States member NB.

Other organizations can participate as Liaison Members, some of which are internal to ISO/IEC and some of which are external. Liaison relationships can be established at different levels within JTC 1 – i.e., at the JTC 1 level, the subcommittee level, or at the level of a specific working group within a subcommittee. Altogether, as of May 2021, there are about 120 external organizations that are in liaison with JTC 1 at one level or another. The liaison relationships established directly at the JTC 1 level are:

- European Commission (EC)
- Ecma International
- International Telecommunication Union (ITU), including ITU-T Study Group 16 on Multimedia

== Structure ==
Most work on the development of standards is done by subcommittees (SCs), each of which deals with a particular field. Most of these subcommittees have several working groups (WGs). Subcommittees, working groups, special working groups (SWGs), and study groups (SGs) within JTC 1 are:

Advisory Groups	Title	Status
ISO/IEC JTC 1/JAG	JTC 1 advisory group	Active
ISO/IEC JTC 1/AG 1	Communications	Active
ISO/IEC JTC 1/AG 2	JTC 1 Emerging Technology and Innovation (JETI)	Active
ISO/IEC JTC 1/AG 6	Autonomous and Data Rich Vehicles	Disbanded
ISO/IEC JTC 1/AG 8	Meta Reference Architecture and Reference Architecture for Systems Integration	Active
ISO/IEC JTC 1/AG 10	Outreach	Active
ISO/IEC JTC 1/AG 14	Systems Integration Facilitation (SIF)	Active
ISO/IEC JTC 1/AG 15	Standards and Regulations	Active
ISO/IEC JTC 1/AG 17	Meeting guidelines - SD 19	Active
ISO/IEC JTC 1/AG 18	Vocabulary	Active
ISO/IEC JTC 1/AG 19	Coordination with ISO TC 20/SC 16 on Unmanned Aircraft Systems (UAS)	Active
Ad Hoc Groups	Title	Status
ISO/IEC JTC 1/AHG 4	Collaboration Across Domains	Active
ISO/IEC JTC 1/AHG 5	JTC 1 Standards Made Freely Available	Active
ISO/IEC JTC 1/AHG 11	Neuromorphic Computing Systems	Active
Working Groups	Title	Status
ISO/IEC JTC 1/WG 4	Document description languages	Disbanded
ISO/IEC JTC 1/WG 7	Sensor networks	Disbanded
ISO/IEC JTC 1/WG 9	Big data	Disbanded
ISO/IEC JTC 1/WG 10	Internet of things (IoT)	Disbanded
ISO/IEC JTC 1/WG 11	Smart cities	Active
ISO/IEC JTC 1/WG 12	3D printing and scanning	Active
ISO/IEC JTC 1/WG 13	Trustworthiness	Active
ISO/IEC JTC 1/WG 14	Quantum computing	Active
Subcommittees	Title	Status
ISO/IEC JTC 1/SC 2	Coded character sets	Active
ISO/IEC JTC 1/SC 6	Telecommunications and information exchange between systems	Active
ISO/IEC JTC 1/SC 7	Software and systems engineering	Active
ISO/IEC JTC 1/SC 17	Cards and security devices for personal identification	Active
ISO/IEC JTC 1/SC 18	Text and office systems	Disbanded
ISO/IEC JTC 1/SC 20	Cryptographic Techniques	Disbanded
ISO/IEC JTC 1/SC 21	Information Retrieval, Transfer, and Management for Open Systems Interconnection	Disbanded
ISO/IEC JTC 1/SC 22	Programming languages, their environments and system software interfaces	Active
ISO/IEC JTC 1/SC 23	Digitally Recorded Media for Information Interchange and Storage	Active
ISO/IEC JTC 1/SC 24	Computer graphics, image processing and environmental data representation	Active
ISO/IEC JTC 1/SC 25	Interconnection of information technology equipment	Active
ISO/IEC JTC 1/SC 27	Information security, cybersecurity and privacy protection	Active
ISO/IEC JTC 1/SC 28	Office equipment	Active
ISO/IEC JTC 1/SC 29	Coding of audio, picture, multimedia and hypermedia information	Active
ISO/IEC JTC 1/SC 30	Open electronic data interchange	Disbanded
ISO/IEC JTC 1/SC 31	Automatic identification and data capture techniques	Active
ISO/IEC JTC 1/SC 32	Data management and interchange	Active
ISO/IEC JTC 1/SC 34	Document description and processing languages	Active
ISO/IEC JTC 1/SC 35	User interfaces	Active
ISO/IEC JTC 1/SC 36	Information technology for learning, education and training	Active
ISO/IEC JTC 1/SC 37	Biometrics	Active
ISO/IEC JTC 1/SC 38	Cloud computing and distributed platforms	Active
ISO/IEC JTC 1/SC 39	Sustainability for and by information technology	Active
ISO/IEC JTC 1/SC 40	IT service management and IT governance	Active
ISO/IEC JTC 1/SC 41	Internet of things and related technologies	Active
ISO/IEC JTC 1/SC 42	Artificial intelligence	Active
ISO/IEC JTC 1/SC 43	Brain-computer interfaces	Active
Study Groups	Title	Status
ISO/IEC JTC 1/SG 1	Smart cities	Disbanded
ISO/IEC JTC 1/SG 2	Big data	Disbanded
ISO/IEC JTC 1/SG 3	3D Printing and scanning	Active
Special Working Groups	Title	Status
ISO/IEC JTC 1/SWG 1	Accessibility (SWG-A)	Disbanded
ISO/IEC JTC 1/SWG 2	Directives	Disbanded
ISO/IEC JTC 1/SWG 3	Planning	Disbanded
ISO/IEC JTC 1/SWG 5	Internet of things (IoT)	Disbanded
ISO/IEC JTC 1/SWG 6	Management	Disbanded
ISO/IEC JTC 1/SWG 7	JTC 1 JAG group on emerging technologies and innovations (JETI)	Disbanded

Each subcommittee can have subgroups created for specific purposes:

- Study Groups (SGs) are chartered to investigate the need and feasibility of additional standardization and/or guidance in a technical area. The main objective of a Study Group is to understand the current activities in a particular area and make recommendations to JTC 1 or a specific subcommittee.
- Working Groups (WGs) are established to expedite development of one or more approved work items and will exist as long as it has responsibility for approved work items.
- Other Working Groups (OWGs) undertake specific tasks between the meetings of a subcommittee. These tasks are defined in the terms of reference of the OWG.

Subcommittees can be created to deal with new situations (SC 37 was established in 2002; SC 38 in 2009; SC 39 in 2012; and SC 40 in 2013) or disbanded if the area of work is no longer relevant. There is no requirement for any member body to maintain status on any or all of the subcommittees.

== See also ==
- International Organization for Standardization
- International Electrotechnical Commission
- American National Standards Institute
- List of IEC technical committees
- List of ISO standards
