= ISO/IEC JTC 1/SC 25 =

IT interconnect standards subcommittee

ISO/IEC JTC 1/SC 25 Interconnection of information technology equipment is a standardization subcommittee of the Joint Technical Committee ISO/IEC JTC 1, of the International Organization for Standardization (ISO) and the International Electrotechnical Commission (IEC), which develops and facilitates standards within the field of interconnection of information technology equipment. The international secretariat of ISO/IEC JTC 1/SC 25 is the Deutsches Institut für Normung (DIN) located in Germany.

== History ==
ISO/IEC JTC 1/SC 25 was formed in 1989 after the creation of ISO/IEC JTC 1. When ISO and IEC decided to create the joint technical committee, JTC 1, in 1988, there was a reorganization of the structure. Eventually in 1989, IEC SC 83: Information technology equipment and ISO/IEC JTC 1/SC 13: Interconnection of equipment, were joined to form the current subcommittee, ISO/IEC JTC 1/SC 25: Interconnection of information technology equipment. The new subcommittee also adopted the standardization activity of ISO/IEC JTC 1/SC 26, under ISO/IEC JTC 1/SC 25/WG 4.

== Scope ==
The scope of ISO/IEC JTC 1/SC 25 is the standardization of:

- Microprocessor systems; and of
- interfaces, protocols, architectures, and associated interconnecting media for information technology equipment and networks, generally for
  - Commercial and residential environments, to support embedded and distributed computing environments, storage systems, other input/output
  - Home and building electronic systems including customer premises smart grid applications for electricity, gas, water and heat.

The scope includes:

- Requirements for components, assemblies, and subsystems
- The development of network interfaces, in liaison with committees for external utility networks, to support smart grid applications at the customer premises.

The scope excludes:

- Standardization of cables, waveguides and connectors remains within the relevant product technical committees and subcommittees of IEC.

== Structure ==
ISO/IEC JTC 1/SC 25 is made up of three active working groups and one task group, each of which carries out specific tasks in standards development within the field of interconnection of information technology equipment. As a response to changing standardization needs, working groups of ISO/IEC JTC 1/SC 25 can be disbanded if their area of work is no longer applicable, or established if new working areas arise. The focus of each working group is described in the group’s terms of reference. Active working groups of ISO/IEC JTC 1/SC 25 are:

Working Group	Working Area
ISO/IEC JTC 1/SC 25/WG 1	Home electronic systems
ISO/IEC JTC 1/SC 25/WG 3	Customer premises cabling
ISO/IEC JTC 1/SC 25/WG 4	Interconnection of computer systems and attached equipment

ISO/IEC JTC 1/SC 25 also has the task group (TG), ISO/IEC JTC 1/SC 25/TG 1, titled Project Team: Taxonomy and Terminology (PTTT), which is working to coordinate the standardization activities for intelligent homes.

== Collaborations ==
ISO/IEC JTC 1/SC 25 works in close collaboration with a number of other organizations or subcommittees, both internal and external to ISO or IEC, in order to avoid conflicting or duplicative work. Organizations internal to ISO or IEC that collaborate with or are in liaison to ISO/IEC JTC 1/SC 25 include:

- ISO/IEC JTC 1/SC 6, Telecommunications and information exchange between systems
- ISO/IEC JTC 1/SC 27, IT Security techniques
- ISO/IEC JTC 1/SC 32, Data management and interchange
- ISO/IEC JTC 1/SC 39, Sustainability for and by Information Technology
- ISO/TC 184, Automation systems and integration
- ISO/TC 205, Building environment design
- IEC/TC 1, Terminology
- IEC/TC 3, Information structures and elements, identification and marking principles, documentation and graphical symbols
- IEC/TC 46, Cables, wires, waveguides, R.F. connectors, R.F. and microwave passive components and accessories
- IEC/SC 46A, Coaxial cables
- IEC/SC 46C, Wires and symmetric cables
- IEC/TC 48, Electrical connectors and mechanical structures for electrical and electronic equipment
- IEC/SC 48B, Electrical connectors
- IEC/SC 61C, Safety of refrigeration appliances for household and commercial use
- IEC/TC 64, Electrical installations and protection against electric shock
- IEC/SC 65B, Measurement and control devices
- IEC/SC 65C, Industrial networks
- IEC/TC 68, Magnetic alloys and steels
- IEC/TC 77, Electromagnetic compatibility
- IEC/TC 86, Fibre optics
- IEC/SC 86A, Fibres and cables
- IEC/SC 86B, Fibre optic interconnecting devices and passive components
- IEC/SC 86C, Fibre optic systems and active devices
- IEC/TC 100, Audio, video and multimedia systems and equipment
- IEC/TC 104, Environmental conditions, classification and methods of test

Some organizations external to ISO or IEC that collaborate with or are in liaison to ISO/IEC JTC 1/SC 25 include:

- CEN TC 247, BACnet
- CENELEC TC 205, Home and Building Electronic Systems (HBES)
- CENELEC TC 215, Electrotechnical aspects of telecommunication equipment
- Ecma International
- European Commission (EC)
- European Telecommunications Standards Institute (ETSI)
- IEEE 802.3, Ethernet Working Group
- ITU-T SG9, Broadband cable and TV
- ITU-T SG15, Networks, Technologies and Infrastructures for Transport, Access and Home
- ITU-T SG16, Multimedia
- Telecommunications Industry Association (TIA)
- United Nations Conference on Trade and Development (UNCTAD)
- United Nations Economic Commission for Europe (UNECE)

== Member countries ==
Countries pay a fee to ISO to be members of subcommittees.

The 29 "P" (participating) members of ISO/IEC JTC 1/SC 25 are: Australia, Austria, Belgium, Canada, China, Czech Republic, Denmark, Finland, France, Germany, India, Ireland, Israel, Italy, Japan, Kazakhstan, Republic of Korea, Lebanon, Mexico, Netherlands, Norway, Poland, Russian Federation, Singapore, Spain, Sweden, Switzerland, United Kingdom, and United States.

The 18 "O" (observing) members of ISO/IEC JTC 1/SC 25 are: Argentina, Bosnia and Herzegovina, Croatia, Cuba, Ghana, Greece, Hong Kong, Hungary, Iceland, Indonesia, Kenya, Malaysia, New Zealand, Philippines, Romania, Serbia, Turkey, and Ukraine.

== Published standards ==
ISO/IEC JTC 1/SC 25 currently has 177 published standards under their direct responsibility within the field of interconnection of information technology equipment, including:

ISO/IEC Standard	Title	Status	Description	WG
ISO/IEC 14543-2-1	Information technology – Home Electronic Systems (HES) Architecture – Part 2-1: Introduction and device modularity	Published (2006)	Specifies the general features and basic functional structure of a Home Electronic System (HES)	1
ISO/IEC 15045-1	Information technology – Home Electronic System (HES) gateway – Part 1: A residential gateway model for HES	Published (2004)	Specifies a residential gateway (RG), which is a device for the HES that connects home network domains to network domains outside the house	1
ISO/IEC 18012-2	Information technology – Home Electronic System – Guidelines for product interoperability – Part 2: Taxonomy and application interoperability model	Published (2012)	Specifies a taxonomy and application interoperability model for the interoperability of products in the area of home systems	1
ISO/IEC 29341-1	Information technology – UPnP Device Architecture – Part 1: UPnP Device Architecture Version 1.0	Published (2011)	Defines UPnP technology which describes an architecture for pervasive peer-to-peer network connectivity of intelligent appliances, wireless devices, and PCs of all form factors	1
ISO/IEC 11801	Information technology – Generic cabling for customer premises	Published (2002)	Specifies generic cabling for use within premises, which may comprise single or multiple bindings on a campus	3
ISO/IEC 15018	Information technology – Generic cabling for homes	Published (2004)	Specifies a generic cabling for three groups of home applications: Information and Communication Technologies (ICT), Broadcast and Communications Technologies (BCT), and Commands, Controls, and Communication in Buildings (CCCB)	3
ISO/IEC 24702	Information technology – Generic cabling – Industrial premises	Published (2006)	Specifies a wide range of communications services including automation, process control, and monitoring applications for use in industrial premises	3
ISO/IEC 24764	Information technology – Generic cabling systems for data centres	Published (2010)	Specifies generic cabling that supports a wide range of communications services for use within data centres	3
ISO 9314-2	Information processing systems – Fibre Distributed Data Interface (FDDI) – Part 2: Token Ring Media Access Control (MAC)	Published (1989)	Describes the MAC, the lower sublayer of the data link layer, for Fibre Distributed Data Interface (FDDI)	4
ISO/IEC 9314-3	Information processing systems – Fibre Distributed Data Interface (FDDI) – Part 3: Physical Layer Medium Dependent (PMD)	Published (1990)	Defines the structure of the FDDI and specifies the functions and operations necessary to insure interoperability between conforming FDDI implementations	4
ISO/IEC 14165-115	Information technology – Fibre Channel – Part 115: Physical Interfaces (FC-PI)	Published (2006)	Describes the physical interface portions of a high performance serial link that supports the higher Upper Level Protocols (ULPs) associated with Intelligent Peripheral Interface (IPI), Small Computer System Interface (SCSI), High-Performance Parallel Interface (HIPPI), and Internet Protocol (IP)	4
ISO/IEC 18372 free	Information technology – RapidIO(TM) interconnect specification	Published (2004)	Addresses the need for a high-performance low pin count packet-switched system level interconnect to be used in a variety of applications as an open standard	4
ISO/IEC 24740	Information technology – Responsive Link (RL)	Published (2008)	Specifies the communication protocol and interface of Responsive Link, a real-time communications method for parallel/distributed control	4

== See also ==
- ISO/IEC JTC 1
- List of ISO standards
- Deutsches Institut für Normung
- International Organization for Standardization
- International Electrotechnical Commission
