= ISO/IEC JTC 1/SC 23 =

ISO/IEC JTC 1/SC 23 Digitally recorded media for information interchange and storage is a standardization subcommittee of the joint technical committee ISO/IEC JTC 1 of the International Organization for Standardization (ISO) and the International Electrotechnical Commission (IEC), which develops and facilitates standards within the field of removable digital storage media for digital information interchange. The international secretariat of ISO/IEC JTC 1/SC 23 is the Japanese Industrial Standards Committee (JISC) located in Japan.

== History ==
The first ISO/TC 97/SC 23 Meeting was held in Tokyo in 1985. The subcommittee had the title, “Optical disk cartridges.” After the creation of JTC1, ISO/IEC JTC 1/SC 23 held its first plenary in November to December 1988 in Maastricht, Netherlands. The subcommittee title was later changed a number of times up to its current title, “Digitally recorded media for information interchange and storage,” as of 2006. In 1989, ISO/IEC JTC 1/SC 23 adopted the File Formats standards maintenance from ISO/IEC JTC 1/SC 15 and was also merged with ISO/IEC JTC 1/SC 11, “Magnetic recording tape and disc,” in 2004. The joint working group, ISO/IEC JTC 1/SC 23/JWG 1, with ISO/TC 42 and ISO/TC 171/SC 1 was created in 2008.

== Scope ==
The scope of ISO/IEC JTC 1/SC 23 is “Standardization in the field of removable digital storage media utilizing optical, holographic and magnetic recording technologies, and flash memory technologies for digital information interchange, including:”

- Algorithms for lossless compression of data
- Volume and file structure
- Methods for determining the life expectancy of digital storage media
- Methods for error monitoring of digital storage media

== Structure ==
ISO/IEC JTC 1/SC 23 presently has no active working groups (WG) or joint working groups (JWG). As a response to changing standardization needs, working groups of ISO/IEC JTC 1/SC 23 can be disbanded if their area of work is no longer applicable, or established if new working areas arise. The focus of a working group is described in the group's terms of reference. The following two working groups of ISO/IEC JTC 1/SC 23 were disbanded by resolution approved at the 2014 plenary meeting:

Working Group	Working Area
ISO/IEC JTC 1/SC 23/WG 6 (disbanded)	iVDR Cartridge
ISO/IEC JTC 1/SC 23/JWG 1(WG 7) (disbanded)	Joint working group with ISO/TC 42, and ISO/TC 171/SC 1

ISO/IEC JTC 1/SC 23/JWG 1 (WG 7) was disbanded in 2014 as the revision work of ISO/IEC 16963 was nearly completed and no future work was planned. The maintenance of ISO/IEC 16963 and related issues is now directly handled by ISO/IEC JTC 1/SC 23. ISO/IEC JTC 1/SC 23/WG 6 has had no activity since 2009 and since no new proposals were expected in the near future, it was disbanded in 2014.

== Collaborations ==
ISO/IEC JTC 1/SC 23 works in close collaboration with a number of other organizations or subcommittees, both internal and external to ISO or IEC, in order to avoid conflicting or duplicative work. Organizations internal to ISO or IEC that collaborate with or are in liaison to ISO/IEC JTC 1/SC 23 include:

- ISO/TC 42, Photography
- ISO/TC 171, Document management applications
- ISO/TC 171/SC 1, Quality
- ISO/TC 215, Health informatics
- IEC TC 100/TA 6, Storage media, storage data structures, storage systems and equipment

Some organizations external to ISO or IEC that collaborate with or are in liaison to ISO/IEC JTC 1/SC 23 include:

- Ecma International
- World Intellectual Property Organization (WIPO)

== Member countries ==
Countries pay a fee to ISO to be members of subcommittees.

The 7 "P" (participating) members of ISO/IEC JTC 1/SC 23 are: China, Japan, Republic of Korea, Netherlands, Russian Federation, Switzerland, and United States.

The 20 "O" (observer) members of ISO/IEC JTC 1/SC 23 are: Argentina, Belgium, Bosnia and Herzegovina, Bulgaria, Cuba, Czech Republic, Finland, France, Ghana, Hungary, Iceland, India, Indonesia, Islamic Republic of Iran, Italy, Kazakhstan, Poland, Romania, Serbia, and Thailand.

== Published standards ==
ISO/IEC JTC 1/SC 23 currently has 145 published standards within the field of digitally recorded media for information interchange and storage, including:

ISO/IEC Standard	Title	Status	Description	WG
ISO/IEC 29171	Information technology – Digitally recorded media for information interchange and storage – Information Versatile Disk for Removable usage (iVDR) cartridge	Published (2009)	Specifies the dimensional, mechanical, and physical characteristics of an information versatile disk for removable usage (iVDR) cartridge to allow for better interchangeability	6
ISO 9660/Amd. 1	Information processing – Volume and file structure of CD-ROM for information interchange	Published (1988); Amendment (2013)	Specifies the volume and file structure of compact read-only optical disks (CD-ROM) for the information interchange between information processing systems	
ISO/IEC 10090 free	Information technology – 90 mm optical disk cartridges, rewritable and read-only, for data interchange	Published (1992)	Specifies: The conditions for conformance testing and the Reference Drive; The mechanical and the physical characteristics of the cartridge; The format of the information on the disk; The characteristics of the embossed data on the disk; The magneto-optical characteristics of the disk; The minimum quality of user-written data on the disk	
ISO/IEC 10995	Information technology – Digitally recorded media for information interchange and storage – Test method for the estimation of the archival lifetime of optical media	Published (2011)	Specifies an accelerated aging test method for estimating the life expectancy for the retrievability of information stored on recordable or rewritable optical disks, including formats such as: DVD-R, DVD-RW, DVD-RAM, +R, and +RW	
ISO/IEC 12862	Information technology – 120 mm (8,54 Gbytes per side) and 80 mm (2,66 Gbytes per side) DVD recordable disk for dual layer (DVD-R for DL)	Published (2011)	Specifies the mechanical, physical, and optical characteristics of a 120 mm and 80 mm dual layer DVD recordable disk to enable the interchange of such disks	
ISO/IEC 16963	Information technology – Digitally recorded media for information interchange and storage – Test method for the estimation of lifetime of optical media for long-term data storage	Published (2011)	Specifies an accelerated aging test method for estimating the lifetime of the retrievability of information stored on recordable or rewritable optical disks, including formats such as: DVD-R, DVD-RW, DVD-RAM, +R, +RW, CD-R, and CD-RW	7
ISO/IEC 29121	Information technology – Digitally recorded media for information interchange and storage – Data migration method for DVD-R, DVD-RW, DVD-RAM, +R, and +RW disks	Published (2013)	Specifies a data migration method for long-term data storage, allowing for manufacturers to construct storage systems that use DVD-R, DVD-RW, DVD-RAM, +R, or +RW disks for information storage.	
ISO/IEC 30190	Information technology – Digitally recorded media for information interchange and storage – 120 mm Single Layer (25,0 Gbytes per disk) and Dual Layer (50,0 Gbytes per disk) BD Recordable disk	Published (2013)	Specifies the mechanical, physical, and optical characteristics of a 120 mm recordable optical disk with a capacity of 25,0 Gbytes or 50,0 Gbytes. Also allows for interchange between disks and disk drives.	
ISO/IEC 30191	Information technology – Digitally recorded media for information interchange and storage – 120 mm Triple Layer (100,0 Gbytes per disk) and Quadruple Layer (128,0 Gbytes per disk) BD Recordable disk	Published (2013)	Specifies the mechanical, physical and optical characteristics of a 120 mm recordable optical disk with a capacity of 100,0 Gbytes or 128,0 Gbytes. Also allows for interchange between disks and disk drives.	
ISO/IEC 30192	Information technology – Digitally recorded media for Information interchange and storage – 120 mm Single Layer (25,0 Gbytes per disk) and Dual Layer (50,0 Gbytes per disk) BD Rewritable disk	Published (2013)	Specifies the mechanical, physical and optical characteristics of a 120 mm Rewritable optical disk with a capacity of 25,0 Gbytes or 50,0 Gbytes. Also allows for interchange between disks and disk drives.	
ISO/IEC 30193	Information technology – Digitally recorded media for Information interchange and storage – 120 mm Triple Layer (100,0 Gbytes per disk) BD Rewritable disk	Published (2013)	Specifies the mechanical, physical and optical characteristics of a 120 mm Rewritable optical disk with a capacity of 100,0 Gbytes. Also allows for interchange between disks and disk drives.	

== See also ==
- ISO/IEC JTC 1
- Japanese Industrial Standards Committee
- International Organization for Standardization
- International Electrotechnical Commission
