= ISO/IEC JTC 1/SC 17 =

ISO/IEC JTC 1/SC 17 Cards and security devices for personal identification is a standardization subcommittee of the Joint Technical Committee ISO/IEC JTC 1 of the International Organization for Standardization (ISO) and the International Electrotechnical Commission (IEC), which develops and facilitates standards within the field of identification cards and personal identification. The international secretariat of ISO/IEC JTC 1/SC 17 is the British Standards Institution (BSI) located in the United Kingdom.

== History ==
In 1969, at the request of the American National Standards Institute (ANSI), ISO/TC 95, Office Machines, set up a working group to consider whether there was a requirement for International Standardization in the area of credit cards. Several meetings were held in 1969 and early 1970 to consider the development of a credit card standard and the requirement for a numbing system. The standard was to be based on the existing ANSI X4A11 standard. In July 1970 the working group recommended that ISO/TC 95 form a permanent subcommittee to be known as ISO/TC 95/SC 17.

The subcommittee met for the first time in May 1971 in Geneva, Switzerland. At this meeting agreement was reached on the first draft ISO standard for Embossed ‘Credit Cards’ and a procedure for the registration of Numeric Identifiers for Credit Card Issuers. An offer was made by the American Bankers Association to administer the issuance of these identifiers, a role they fulfill to this day; over 40 years of service.

In 1979, the subcommittee became part of ISO/TC 97, Information Technology. Finally, in 1988 the subcommittee became part of the ISO/IEC Joint Technical Committee 1 (JTC 1) as ISO/IEC JTC 1/SC 17 with the title, “Identification cards and credit cards.” Its first plenary as such was held in Toronto, Canada. In 1999 the title of the subcommittee was changed to its current title, “Cards and personal identification.” Since then, ISO/IEC JTC 1/SC 17 has had a number of plenaries held in various countries, including: Japan, Canada, Denmark, Singapore, Australia, South Africa, France, Germany, United Kingdom, China, and Spain.

== Scope ==
The scope of ISO/IEC JTC 1/SC 17 is “standardization in the area of:

- Identification and related documents
- Cards

and devices associated with their use in inter-industry applications and International interchange”

== Structure ==
ISO/IEC JTC 1/SC 17 is made up of eight active Working Groups (WGs), each of which carries out specific tasks in standards development within the field of cards and personal identification. Working groups can be created or disbanded in response to changing standardization needs. The focus of each Working Group is described in the group’s terms of reference. Active Working Groups of ISO/IEC JTC 1/SC 17 are:

Working Group	Working Area
ISO/IEC JTC 1/SC 17/WG 1	Physical characteristics and test methods for ID-cards
ISO/IEC JTC 1/SC 17/WG 3	Identification cards
ISO/IEC JTC 1/SC 17/WG 4	Generic interfaces and protocols for security devices
ISO/IEC JTC 1/SC 17/WG 8	Integrated circuit cards without contacts
ISO/IEC JTC 1/SC 17/WG 10	Motor vehicle driver licence and related documents
ISO/IEC JTC 1/SC 17/WG 11	Application of biometrics to cards and personal identification
ISO/IEC JTC 1/SC 17/WG 12	UAS License and Drone/UAS Security Module

== Collaborations ==
ISO/IEC JTC 1/SC 17 works in close collaboration with a number of other organizations or subcommittees, both internal and external to ISO or IEC, in order to avoid conflicting or duplicative work. Organizations internal to ISO or IEC that collaborate with or are in liaison to ISO/IEC JTC 1/SC 17 include:

- ISO/IEC JTC 1/SC 6, Telecommunications and information exchange between systems
- ISO/IEC JTC 1/SC 27, Information security, cybersecurity and privacy protection
- ISO/IEC JTC 1/SC 31, Automatic identification and data capture techniques
- ISO/IEC JTC 1/SC 37, Biometrics
- ISO/TC 68, Financial services
- ISO/TC 68/SC 7, Core banking
- ISO/TC 204, Intelligent transport systems
- ISO/TC 215, Health informatics
- ISO/TC 241, Road traffic safety management systems

Some organizations external to ISO or IEC that collaborate with or are in liaison to ISO/IEC JTC 1/SC 17 include:

- American Express (AMEX)
- Common Study Center of Telediffusion and Telecommunication (CCETT)
- CEN/TC 224, Personal identification, electronic signature and cards and their related systems and operations
- Ecma International
- International Air Transport Association (IATA)
- International Civil Aviation Organization (ICAO)
- International Card Manufacturers Association (ICMA)
- International Labour Organization (ILO)
- Java Card Forum
- MasterCard
- NFC Forum
- VISA
- Visa Europe Services (VISA EUROPE)
- United Nations Economic Commission for Europe (UNECE)
- European Data Centre Association (EUDCA)

== Member countries ==
Countries pay a fee to ISO to be members of subcommittees.

The 34 "P" (participating) members of ISO/IEC JTC 1/SC 17 are: Armenia, Australia, Austria, Belgium, Canada, China, Czech Republic, Denmark, Finland, France, Germany, India, Israel, Italy, Japan, Kenya, Republic of Korea, Luxembourg, Malaysia, Netherlands, Norway, Poland, Portugal, Romania, Russian Federation, Singapore, Slovakia, Slovenia, South Africa, Spain, Sweden, Switzerland, United Kingdom, and United States of America.

The 18 "O" (observer) members of ISO/IEC JTC 1/SC 17 are: Argentina, Bosnia and Herzegovina, Croatia, Estonia, Ghana, Hungary, Iceland, Indonesia, Islamic Republic of Iran, Ireland, Kazakhstan, Lithuania, New Zealand, Serbia, Thailand, Turkey, Ukraine, and Viet Nam.

== Standardization activity ==
ISO/IEC JTC 1/SC 17 currently has 123 published standards within the field of cards and personal identification, some of which are freely available. The types of standards developed by the subcommittee, by working group, include:

- WG 1: Standards related to the physical characteristics and test methods of ID cards: describe the physical characteristics, embossing, magnetic stripe, and testing methods for conformance and card durability for ID cards.
- WG 3: Machine-readable travel documents standards: define machine readable travel documents and related machine readable cards; the working group is responsible for:
  - the preparation of a revised text of the ISO/IEC 7501 series, Identification cards – Machine readable travel documents (Freely available: Part 1, Part 2, Part 3)
  - monitoring and defining machine-readable travel document standards in liaison with ICAO
- WG 4: Generic interfaces and protocols for security devices: define specifications related to the integrated circuit card with contacts
- WG 5: Issuer identification numbers: maintenance of the ISO/IEC 7812 series, Identification cards – Identification of issuers; responsible for registration of application providers under ISO/IEC 7816-5, in liaison with ISO/IEC JTC 1/SC 17/WG 4.
- WG 8: Contactless integrated circuit card standards: promote the operation of the contactless integrated circuit(s) card
- WG 10: Standards for motor vehicle drivers license, mobile driver license (mDL) and related mobile vehicle documents: promote the development of ISO compliant driving licenses and other related motor vehicle documents
- WG 11: Biometrics standards: promote the interoperability of inter-industry and government applications using personal identification technologies, such as non-generic biometrics
- WG 12: UAS License and Drone/UAS Security Module: definine specifications on the UAS-license.

For a complete set of standards published by ISO/IEC JTC 1/SC 17 and detailed descriptions, see the document “Summary of Standards.”

== See also ==
- ISO/IEC JTC 1
- List of ISO standards
- British Standards Institution
- International Organization for Standardization
- International Electrotechnical Commission
