= ISO/IEC JTC 1/SC 39 =

ISO/IEC JTC 1/SC 39 Sustainability for and by Information Technology is a standardization subcommittee of the Joint Technical Committee ISO/IEC JTC 1 of the International Organization for Standardization (ISO) and the International Electrotechnical Commission (IEC), that develops and facilitates standards within the field of sustainability and resource efficiency through Information Technology. The international secretariat of ISO/IEC JTC 1/SC 39 is the American National Standards Institute (ANSI), located in the United States.

== History ==
ISO/IEC JTC 1/SC 39 was formed in November 2011 during the 26th Plenary Meeting of ISO/IEC JTC 1 in San Diego, California, with the intent of continuing ISO/IEC JTC 1's work in energy efficiency issues. The subcommittee was established after Resolution 27 was approved by ISO/IEC JTC 1, which outlined the new subcommittee's terms of reference, proposed working groups (WGs), and expected liaison activity. A working group on Energy Efficient Date Centres and its terms of reference were proposed in this document, though the title of the working group was later changed to Resource Efficient Data Centres. ISO/IEC JTC 1/SC 39 held its first plenary meeting in Redwood Shores, California in June 2012. The meeting concluded with the appointment of a chairperson to the subcommittee: director of global standards, codes, and environment at Schneider Electric, Jay Taylor.

== Scope and mission ==
The scope of ISO/IEC JTC 1/SC 39 is "Standardization related to the intersection of resource efficiency and IT which supports environmentally and economically viable development, application, operation, and management aspects."

The mission of ISO/IEC JTC 1/SC 39 is to use standardization related to the efficient use of resources to propel and sustain the economically and environmentally viable development of Information Technology.

== Structure ==
ISO/IEC JTC 1/SC 39 is made up of two working groups (WGs), each of which carries out specific tasks in standards development within the field of sustainability for and by Information Technology. The focus of each working group is described in the group's terms of reference. Working groups of ISO/IEC JTC 1/SC 39 are:

Working Group	Working Area	Terms of Reference
ISO/IEC JTC 1/SC 39/WG 1	Resource Efficient Data Centres	Development of: Data centre resource efficiency taxonomy, vocabulary, and maturity model; Key Performance Indicators for data centres; Guidance for resource efficient data centres; Energy management system standard for data centres
ISO/IEC JTC 1/SC 39/WG 2	Green ICT	Prepare guidance for the development of energy efficient ICT

ISO/IEC JTC 1/SC 39 also has the Study Group on Gap Analysis which performs gap analyses for assessment methodology for quantifying green effects of ICT functions for education, and guidelines for the adoption of green technologies by other industry sectors through IT.

== Collaborations ==
ISO/IEC JTC 1/SC 39 works in close collaboration with a number of other organizations or subcommittees, both internal and external to ISO or IEC, in order to avoid conflicting or duplicative work. Organizations internal to ISO or IEC that collaborate with or are in liaison to ISO/IEC JTC 1/SC 39 include:

- ISO/IEC JTC 1/SC 36, Information technology for learning, education and training
- ISO/IEC JTC 1/SC 38, Distributed Application Platforms and Services (DAPS)
- ISO/IEC JPC 2, Joint Project Committee - Energy efficiency and renewable energy sources - Common terminology
- ISO/TC 171, Document management applications
- ISO/TC 207, Environmental management
- ISO/TC 242, Energy management
- ISO/TC 257, General technical rules for determination of energy savings in renovation projects, industrial enterprises and regions
- IEC TC 8, Systems aspects for electrical energy supply
- IEC TC 57/WG 21, Power systems management and associated information exchange – Interfaces and protocol profiles relevant to systems connected to the electrical grid
- IEC TC 100, Audio, video and multimedia systems and equipment
- IEC TC 108, Safety of electronic equipment within the field of audio/video, information technology and communication technology
- IEC TC 111, Environmental standardization for electrical and electronic products and systems
- IEC PC 118, Smart grid user interface
- IEC/SEG 1, Systems Evaluation Group - Smart Cities
- IEC SMB SG 3, Smart grid
- IEC SMB SG 4, LVDC distribution systems up to 1500 V DC

Organizations external to ISO or IEC that collaborate with or are in liaison to ISO/IEC JTC 1/SC 39 include:

- Ecma International
- ITU-T SG 5, Environment and climate change
- The Green Grid
- CENELEC TC 215, Electrotechnical aspects of telecommunications equipment
- European Telecommunications Standards Institute (ETSI)

== Member countries ==
Countries pay a fee to ISO to be members of subcommittees.

The 17 "P" (participating) members of ISO/IEC JTC 1/SC 39 are: Belgium, Canada, China, Finland, France, Germany, Italy, Japan, Republic of Korea, Luxembourg, Netherlands, Norway, Russian Federation, Singapore, South Africa, United Kingdom, and United States of America.

The 10 "O" (observing) members of ISO/IEC JTC 1/SC 39 are: Argentina, Australia, Austria, Czech Republic, Islamic Republic of Iran, Ireland, Kenya, Poland, Spain, and Switzerland.

== Standards and Technical Reports ==
ISO/IEC JTC 1/SC 39 has one published standard, ISO/IEC 19395 and is currently working on developing a number of standards within the field of sustainability for and by Information Technology. Some standards within this field currently under development by ISO/IEC JTC 1/SC 39 include:

ISO/IEC Standard	Title	Status	Description	WG
ISO/IEC 19395:2015	Information technology—Sustainability for and by information technology—Smart data centre resource monitoring and control	Published (2015)	This standards models IT and facility equipment, systems and components in Smart Data Centre as resources, organizes the resource in a graph, and specifies the semantics – but not the syntax – of messages for commands, responses and events.	
ISO/IEC NP 30131	Information technology – Data Centres – Taxonomy and Maturity Model	Under development	Provides the foundation for energy/resource efficiency and environmental and economic viability assessments through the specification of a taxonomy and maturity model.	1
ISO/IEC PDTR 30132	Information technology – IT Sustainability – Guidance for the development, evaluation and application of energy efficient computing systems	Under development	Studies and develops guidance for the development of energy efficient ICT products, including goods, networks, and services.	2
ISO/IEC AWI TR 30133	Information technology – Data centres – Guidelines for resource efficient data centres	Under development	Provides guidelines to improve the resource efficiency of data centres by addressing: Data centre classification and taxonomy; Application of the data centre maturity model; Utilization, management and planning; ICT equipment services	1
ISO/IEC DIS 30134-1	Information technology – Data Centres – Key Performance Indicators – Part 1: Overview and general requirements	Under development	Provides definitions of terms used in data centre KPIS; Defines the need of scope of KPIs for resource efficiency in data centres; Defines the areas of KPIs and applications; Defines the guidelines and applicability in establishing a data centre KPI; Provides a structure of document in series of KPIs; Describes a holistic view of resource efficiency	1
ISO/IEC DIS 30134-2	Information technology – Data Centres – Key Performance Indicators – Part 2: Power Usage Effectiveness (PUE)	Under development - International Standard Publication Limit Date 2017-01-17	Defines the Power Usage Effectiveness (PUE) of a data centre; Introduces PUE measurement categories; Describes the relationship of this KPI to a data centre's: infrastructure, IT equipment and IT operations; Defines the measurement, the calculation and reporting of the KPI; Provides information on the correct interpretation of the KPI; The following topics are outside the scope of this International Standard: Other data centre resource focused KPIs such as water or carbon, IT KPIs and IT Operations KPIs	1
ISO/IEC DIS 30134-3	Information technology - Data Centres - Key Performance Indicators - Part 3: Renewable Energy Factor (REF)	Under development - International Standard Publication Limit Date 2017-01-17	This International Standard specifies the Renewable Energy Factor (REF) as a KPI to quantify the use of renewable energy managed by owner/operator for their data centre. Renewable energy here is in the form of electricity.: The REF is defined as the ratio of renewable energy use to all the energy use of the data centre; REF does not include usage of water or other resources, and assessment of carbon footprint of the data centre; Energy savings required to the data centre is out of scope; Embedded energy for building and manufacturing as a whole is out of scope	
ISO/IEC CD 30134-4	Information Technology - Data Centres - Key Performance Indicators - Part 4: IT Equipment Energy Efficiency for Servers (ITEE)	Under development - Draft International Standard Limit Date 2016-05-20 International Standard Publication Limit Date 2017-05-02	This International Standard specifies the process of deriving ITEE as a KPI which quantifies the energy efficiency capacity (maximum capability of work per unit energy) of the servers in a data centre. This document specifies a process by which server effectiveness relative to energy be calculated using a choice of pre-existing or context specific performance benchmarks. The following topics are outside the scope of this project: Energy efficiency KPIs for other types of IT equipment such as storage systems and network equipment; Other data centre resource focused KPIs such as water and carbon; KPIs for energy efficiency of data centre facilities	
ISO/IEC CD 30134-5	Information Technology - Data Centres - Key Performance Indicators - Part 5: IT Equipment for Utilization of Servers (ITEU_SV)	Under development - Draft International Standard Limit Date 2017-04-17 International Standard Publication Limit Date 2018-04-17	This International Standard: Describes the purposes of ITEU_SC, Defines ITEU_SV in a conceptual manner, Describes how to use ITEU_SV, Describes reporting of ITEU_SV, Presents usage examples of ITEU_SV; The following topics are outside of the scope of this project: Energy efficiency of KPIs for other types of IT equipment such as storage systems and network equipment, Other data centre resources focused KPIs such as water and carbon, KPIs for energy efficiency of data centre facility	

== See also ==
- ISO/IEC JTC 1
- List of ISO standards
- American National Standards Institute
- International Organization for Standardization
- International Electrotechnical Commission
