= ISO/IEC JTC 1/SC 36 =

ISO/IEC JTC 1/SC 36 Information Technology for Learning, Education and Training is a standardization subcommittee (SC), which is part of the Joint Technical Committee ISO/IEC JTC 1 of the International Organization for Standardization (ISO) and the International Electrotechnical Commission (IEC), that develops and facilitates standards within the field of information technology (IT) for learning, education and training (LET). ISO/IEC JTC 1/SC 36 was established at the November 1999 ISO/IEC JTC 1 plenary in Seoul, Korea. The subcommittee held its first plenary meeting in March 2000 in London, United Kingdom. The international secretariat of ISO/IEC JTC 1/SC 36 is the Korean Agency for Technology and Standards (KATS), located in the Republic of Korea.

== Scope ==
The scope of ISO/IEC JTC 1/SC 36 is "Standardization in the field of information technologies for learning, education, and training (ITLET) to support individuals, groups, or organizations, and to enable interoperability and reusability of resources and tools".

== Structure ==
ISO/IEC JTC 1/SC 36 is made up of 6 Working Groups (including TCG), 2 Advisory Groups (AG), 1 Ad-Hoc Group(AHG) and 1 Joint Working Group(JWG). Each Working Group carries out specific tasks in standards development within the field of ITLET, where the focus of each working group is described in the group’s terms of reference. The Working Groups of ISO/IEC JTC 1/SC 36 are:

Working Group	Convenor	Working Area	Terms of Reference
ISO/IEC JTC 1/SC 36/WG 3	Rosa-Maria GOMEZ-DE-REGIL(FR)	Learner Information	Standardization with respect to information about roles and organizational positions held by participants within an ITLET system and personal information about participants using an ITLET system
ISO/IEC JTC 1/SC 36/WG 4	Yongsang CHO(KR) Yuntao YU(CN, vice)	Management, Delivery and Orchestration	IT-related standardization for the management, delivery and orchestration of learning, education and training systems, addressing digital resource lifecycle, instructional tool integration, administrative data coordination for orchestration of services
ISO/IEC JTC 1/SC 36/WG 7	Jyotsna Kumar MANDAL(IN)	ITLET - Culture, Language, and Individual Needs	The development of standards that ensure that relevant features and processes of ITLET are adaptable to the requirements of individual users, including the requirements of users with disabilities
ISO/IEC JTC 1/SC 36/WG 8	Yongsang CHO(KR)	Interoperability in Analytics, Evidence and Assessment	Standardization of data models, process specifications, and interoperability frameworks for learning analytics, evidence-based assessment, and trustworthy AI-enabled evaluation within learning, education and training environments
ISO/IEC JTC 1/SC 36/WG 9	Jing Du(CN)	Online Course Information	Standardization for design, development, implementation, organization utilization and evaluation of online courses
ISO/IEC JTC 1/SC 36/AG1	Sung-Wook SHIN(KR)	Business Planning and Communications	Assist the SC36 Chair and Committee manager in the review and update of the SC36 Strategic Business Plan; support SC36 in developing and implementing business, communication, and stakeholder engagement strategies; maintain SC36 digital presence including official websites and public information platforms; and discuss strategic positioning and organizational effectiveness in alignment with evolving ITLET landscape and stakeholder needs.
ISO/IEC JTC 1/SC 36/AG2	Jon Mason(SA)	Emerging Technologies (AGET)	Identifying Emerging Technologies that will have a likely impact on ITLET, and Providing advice to SC36 on Emerging Technologies that need to be considered in developing New Work Items
ISO/IEC JTC 1SC 36/AHG6	Jae Ho, Lee(KR)	Artificial Intelligence for Education (AIEd)	Monitoring of, and liaison with, organizations, projects and other initiatives working in the field of AI, including: open source communities - industry consortia/association - public/private sector initiatives - internal/external liaison organizations
ISO/IEC JTC 1/SC 36/TCG	Jae Ho, Lee(KR)	Terminology Coordination Group	To ensure that the vocabulary of all of SC36 WGs and AGs is monitored and managed during all stages of their development including reviewing terms and definitions in already published standards
JTC1/SC24/JWG12	Erland Øverby (NO), Myeong Won, Lee(KR)	Joint ISO/IEC JTC1/SC 24 - ISO/IEC JTC1/SC 36 WG : VR/AR/MR based ICT Integration Systems standards	Analyze and develop use cases to support requirements for work items in the area of VR/AR/MR based ICT integration systems, and develop standards related to VR/AR/MR based ICT integration systems.

== Collaborations ==
ISO/IEC JTC 1/SC 36 works in close collaboration with a number of other organizations or subcommittees, both internal and external to ISO or IEC, in order to avoid conflicting or duplicative work.

Organizations internal to ISO or IEC that collaborate with or are in liaison to ISO/IEC JTC 1/SC 36 include:

- ISO/IEC JTC 1/SC 17, Cards and personal identification
- ISO/IEC JTC 1/SC 27, IT Security techniques
- ISO/IEC JTC 1/SC 32, Data management and interchange
- ISO/IEC JTC 1/SC 34, Document description and processing languages
- ISO/IEC JTC 1/SC 35, User interfaces
- ISO/IEC JTC 1/SC 39, Sustainability for and by information technology
- ISO/TC 37, Terminology and other language and content resources
- ISO/TC 46, Information and documentation
- ISO/TC 176, Quality management and quality assurance
- ISO/TC 215, Health informatics
- ISO/TC 232, Learning services outside formal education
- ISO/PC 288, Educational organizations management systems – Requirements with guidance for use
- ISO/PC 288/WG1, Educational organizations management systems

Organizations external to ISO or IEC that collaborate with, or are in liaison to, ISO/IEC JTC 1/SC 36 include:

<Current in 2026>

- Agence universitaire de la Francophonie (AUF)
- International Information Centre for Terminology(Infoterm)
- IEEE LTSC, Learning Technology Standards Committee
- 1EdTech, 1EdTech Consortium

<Past>

- Advanced Distributed Learning (ADL)
- Aviation Industry Computer-Based Training Committee (AICC)
- Cartago Alliance
- CEN TC 353, Information and Communication Technologies for Learning, Education and Training
- Dublin Core Metadata Initiative (DCMI)
- IMS Global Learning Consortium
- International Federation for Learning, Education, and Training Systems Interoperability (LETSI)
- International Digital Publishing Forum (IDPF)
- W3C:Indie UI, W3C Web Accessibility Independent User Interface
- Schema.org

== Member countries ==
Countries pay a fee to ISO to be members of subcommittees.

The 21 "P" (participating) members of ISO/IEC JTC 1/SC 36 are: Australia (SA), Canada (SCC), China (SAC), Finland (SFS), France (AFNOR), India (BIS), Iran, Islamic Republic of (INSO), Italy (UNI), Japan (JISC), Kazakhstan(KAZMEST), Republic of Korea (KATS), Netherlands (NEN), Norway (SN), Philippines(BPS), Portugal (IPQ), Russian Federation (GOST R), Slovakia (SOSMT), South Africa (SABS), Spain (UNE), Ukraine (DSTU), United Kingdom (BSI), Zimbabwe(SAZ)

The 30 "O" (observer) members of ISO/IEC JTC 1/SC 36 are: Algeria (IANOR), Argentina (IRAM), Austria (ASI), Belgium (NBN), Bosnia and Herzegovina (BAS), Colombia (ICONTEC), Cyprus (CYS), Czech Republic (UNMZ), Germany (DIN), Ethiopia(IES), Ghana (GSA), Greece(NQIS ELOT), Hong Kong (ITCHKSAR), Hungary (MSZT), Indonesia (BSN), Ireland (NSAI), Kenya (KEBS), New Zealand (SNZ), Pakistan (PSQCA), Romania (ASRO), Rwanda (RSB), Saudi Arabia (SASO), Serbia (ISS), Slovakia (UNMS SR), Sweden (SIS), Switzerland (SNV), Tunisia (INNORPI), Turkey (TSE). Uganda (UNBS)

※ Note: Name of Country(Name of National Body)

== Meeting history ==
#	Date	Location	Total Attendance(remote)
45	2026-09	Sydney, Australia(hybrid)	
44	2026-03	Zoom(virtual)	59
43	2025-09	Tenjin, China(hybrid)	57
42	2025-03	Zoom(virtual)	54
41	2024-09	Zoom(virtual)	57
40	2024-03	Zoom(virtual)	57
39	2023-09	Zoom(virtual)	58
38	2023-03	Zoom(virtual)	69
37	2022-09	Oslo, Norway (hybrid)	58
36	2022-03	Zoom(virtual)	53
35	2020-9	Zoom(virtual)	55
34	2021-03	Zoom(virtual)	62
33	2020-9	Zoom(virtual)	46
32	2019-6	Beijing, China	58
31	2018-6	Daegu, Korea	66
30	2017-6	Melbourne, Australia	58
29	2016-6	Prague, Czech Republic	53(2)
28	2015-6	Rouen, France	53(5)
27	2014-6	Oslo, Norway	50
26	2013-09	Moscow, Russia	53(2)
25	2012-09	Busan, Korea	78
24	2011-09	Shanghai, China	67
23	2011-03	Strasbourg, France	62
22	2010-09	State College, US	58
21	2010-03	Osaka, Japan	68
20	2009-09	Umeå, Sweden	64
19	2009-03	Wellington, New Zealand	62
18	2008-09	Stuttgart, Germany	68
17	2008-03	Jeju Island, Korea	73
16	2007-09	Toronto, Canada	70
15	2007-03	London, UK	73
14	2006-09	Wuhan, China	75
13	2006-03	Turku, Finland	81
12	2005-09	Durham, US	79
11	2005-03	Tokyo, Japan	78
10	2004-09	Dublin, Ireland	61
9	2004-03	Montreal, Canada	75
8	2003-09	Seoul, Korea	50
7	2003-03	Paris, France	85
6	2002-09	Lawrence, Kansas, US	50
5	2002-03	Adelaide, Australia	40
4	2001-09	Copenhagen, Denmark	Cancelled
3	2001-03	New York City, US	35
2	2000-09	Sedona, US	25
1	2000-03	London, UK	35

== Published standards ==
As of 2026, ISO/IEC JTC 1/SC 36 has 59 published standards within the field of Information technology for learning, education and training, including:

ISO/IEC Standard	Title	Status	WG	SDGs
ISO/IEC 2382-36 free	Information technology – Vocabulary – Part 36: Learning, education and training	Published (2013)	1	4
ISO/IEC TR 4339	Information technology for learning, education and training — Reference model for information and communications technology (ICT) evaluation in education	Published (2022)	TBD	4
ISO/IEC 12785-1	Information technology – Learning, education, and training – Content packaging Part 1: Information model	Published (2009)	4	4
ISO/IEC 12785-1/Cor 1	Information technology – Learning, education, and training – Content packaging Part 1: Information model	Published (2013)	4	4
ISO/IEC 12785-2	Information technology – Learning, education, and training – Content packaging Part 2: XML binding	Published (2011)	4	4
ISO/IEC 12785-3	Information technology – Learning, education, and training – Content packaging Part 3: Best practice and implementation guide	Published (2012)	4	4
ISO/IEC 18120	Information technology -- Learning, education, and training -- Requirements for e-textbooks in education	Published (2016)	6	4
ISO/IEC TR 18121	Information technology Learning, education and training Virtual experiment framework	Published (2015)	6	4
ISO/IEC 19479	Information technology for learning, education, and training -- Learner mobility achievement information (LMAI)	Published (2019)	3	4, 5, 8, 9
ISO/IEC 19778-1 free	Information technology – Learning, education and training – Collaborative technology – Collaborative workplace – Part 1: Collaborative workplace data model	Published (2015)	2	4
ISO/IEC 19778-2	Information technology – Learning, education and training – Collaborative technology – Collaborative workplace – Part 2: Collaborative environment data model	Published (2015)	2	4
ISO/IEC 19778-3	Information technology – Learning, education and training – Collaborative technology – Collaborative workplace – Part 3: Collaborative group data model	Published (2015)	2	4
ISO/IEC 19780-1	Information technology – Learning, education and training – Collaborative technology Collaborative learning communication Part 1: Textbased communication	Published (2015)	2	4
ISO/IEC 19788-1 free	Information technology – Learning, education and training – Metadata for learning resources – Part 1: Framework	Published (2011)	4	4
ISO/IEC 19788-1/Amd 1	Information technology – Learning, education and training – Metadata for learning resources – Part 1: Framework	Published (2014)	4	4, 9
ISO/IEC 19788-2	Information technology – Learning, education and training – Metadata for learning resources – Part 2: Dublin Core elements	Published (2011)	4	4, 9
ISO/IEC 19788-2/Amd 1	Information technology – Learning, education and training – Metadata for learning resources – Part 2: Dublin Core elements	Published (2016)	4	4, 9
ISO/IEC 19788-3	Information technology – Learning, education and training – Metadata for learning resources – Part 3: Basic application profile	Published (2011)	4	4, 9
ISO/IEC 19788-3/Amd 1	Information technology – Learning, education and training – Metadata for learning resources – Part 3: Basic application profile	Published (2016)	4	4, 9
ISO/IEC 19788-4	Information technology – Learning, education and training – Metadata for learning resources – Part 4: Technical elements	Published (2014)	4	4, 9
ISO/IEC 19788-5	Information technology – Learning, education and training – Metadata for learning resources – Part 5: Educational elements	Published (2012)	4	4, 9
ISO/IEC 19788-7	Information technology -- Learning, education and training -- Metadata for learning resources -- Part 7: Bindings	Published (2019)	4	4, 9
ISO/IEC 19788-8	Information technology Learning, education and training Metadata for learning resources Part 8: Data elements for MLR records	Published(2015)	4	4, 9
ISO/IEC 19788-9	Information technology Learning, education and training Metadata for learning resources Part 9: Data elements for persons	Published(2015)	4	4, 9
ISO/IEC 19788-11	Information technology -- Learning, education and training -- Metadata for learning resources -- Part 11: Migration from LOM to MLR	Published(2017)	4	4, 9
ISO/IEC 19796-3	Information technology – Learning, education and training – Quality management, assurance and metrics – Part 3: Reference methods and metrics	Published (2009)	5	4, 9, 16
ISO/IEC 20006-1	Information technology for learning, education and training – Information model for competency Part 1: Competency general framework and information model	Published(2014)	3	4, 8
ISO/IEC 20006-2	Information technology for learning, education and training – Information model for competency Part 2: Proficiency level information model	Published(2015)	3	4, 8
ISO/IEC TS 20013	Information technology for learning, education and training – A reference framework of ePortfolio information	Published(2020)	3	4, 5, 8, 9, 11
ISO/IEC 20016-1	Information technology for learning, education and training – Language accessibility and human interface equivalencies (HIEs) in elearning applications Part 1: Framework and reference model for semantic interoperability	Published(2014)	7	4, 10
ISO/IEC TR 20748-1	Information technology for learning, education and training -- Learning analytics interoperability -- Part 1: Reference model	Published(2016)	8	4, 9, 16
ISO/IEC TR 20748-2	Information technology for learning, education and training -- Learning analytics interoperability -- Part 2: System requirements	Published(2017)	8	4, 9, 16
ISO/IEC TS 20748-3	Information technology for learning, education and training — Learning analytics interoperability — Part 3: Guidelines for data interoperability	Published (2020)	8	4, 9, 16
ISO/IEC TS 20748-4	Information technology for learning, education and training — Learning analytics interoperability — Part 4: Privacy and data protection policies	Published (2019)	8	4, 9, 16
ISO/IEC TR 20821	Information technology -- Learning, education and training -- Learning environment components for automated contents adaptation	Published(2018)	7	4, 5, 9, 10
ISO/IEC 22602	Information technology — Learning, education and training — Competency models expressed in MLR	Published (2019)	4	4, 8
ISO/IEC 23126	Information technology for learning, education and training — Ubiquitous learning resource organization and description framework	Published (2021)	4	4
ISO/IEC 23127-1	Information technology — Learning, education, and training — Metadata for facilitators of online learning — Part 1: Framework	Published (2021)	3	4, 9, 10
ISO/IEC TR 23842-1	Information technology for learning, education and training — Human factor guidelines for virtual reality content — Part 1: Considerations when using VR content	Published (2020)	7	4, 10
ISO/IEC TR 23842-2	Information technology for learning, education, and training — Human factor guidelines for virtual reality content — Part 2: Considerations when making VR content	Published (2020)	7	4, 10
ISO/IEC TR 23843	Information technology for learning, education and training — Catalogue model for virtual, augmented and mixed reality content	Published (2020)	4	4, 9
ISO/IEC 23988	Information technology A code of practice for the use of information technology (IT) in the delivery of assessments	Published(2007)	5	4, 9
ISO/IEC 24703	Information technology Participant Identifiers	Published(2004)	3	4, 16
ISO/IEC 24751-1 free	Information technology – Individualized adaptability and accessibility in e-learning, education and training – Part 1: Framework and reference model	Published (2008)	7	4, 5, 10
ISO/IEC 24751-2	Information technology Individualized adaptability and accessibility in elearning, education and training Part 2: "Access for all" personal needs and preferences for digital delivery	Published(2008)	7	4, 5, 10
ISO/IEC 24751-3	Information technology Individualized adaptability and accessibility in elearning, education and training Part 3: "Access for all" digital resource description	Published(2008)	7	4, 5, 10
ISO/IEC TS 24751-4	Information technology for learning, education and training — AccessForAll framework for individualized accessibility — Part 4: Registry server API	Published (2023)	7	4, 5, 10
ISO/IEC TR 24763	Information technology — Learning, education and training — Conceptual Reference Model for Competency Information and Related Objects	Published (2011)	3	4, 8, 9
ISO/IEC 29140	Information technology for learning, education and training — Nomadicity and mobile technologies	Published (2021)	3	4, 9
ISO/IEC TR 29163-1	Information technology — Sharable Content Object Reference Model (SCORM®) 2004 3rd Edition — Part 1: Overview Version 1.1	Published (2009)	4	4, 9
ISO/IEC TR 29163-2	Information technology — Sharable Content Object Reference Model (SCORM®) 2004 3rd Edition — Part 2: Content Aggregation Model Version 1.1	Published (2009)	4	4, 9
ISO/IEC TR 29163-3	Information technology — Sharable Content Object Reference Model (SCORM®) 2004 3rd Edition — Part 3: Run-Time Environment Version 1.1	Published (2009)	4	4, 9
ISO/IEC TR 29163-4	Information technology — Sharable Content Object Reference Model (SCORM®) 2004 3rd Edition — Part 4: Sequencing and Navigation Version 1.1	Published (2009)	4	4, 9
ISO/IEC 29187-1 free	Information technology – Identification of privacy protection requirements pertaining to learning, education and training (LET) – Part 1: Framework and reference model	Published (2013)	3	4, 9, 16
ISO/IEC 40180	Information technology - Quality for learning, education and training - Fundamentals and reference framework	Published (2017)	5	4, 9, 16
ISO/IEC TR 23844	Information technology for learning, education and training — Immersive content and technology	Published (2023)	TBD	4, 9
ISO/IEC DIS 8808	Information technology for learning, education and training — Online course information model	Published (2026)	9	4
ISO/IEC CD TR 9858	Information technology — Use cases on advanced learning analytics services using emerging technologies	Published (2026)	8	4
ISO/IEC DIS 4932	Information technology — Learning, education and training — Access for All Metadata: Accessibility Core Terms (AfA-core-terms)	Published (2025)	4	4, 10
ISO/IEC/IEEE 39274-1-1	Learning technology — JavaScript Object Notation (JSON) data model format and Representational State Transfer (RESTful) web service for learner experience data tracking and access — Part 1-1: xAPI using JSON serialization and RESTful data transport	Published (2025)	TBD	4, 9

== Help desk ==
- What is Online Standards Development(OSD)

== See also ==
- ISO/IEC JTC 1
- List of ISO standards
- Korean Agency for Technology and Standards
- International Organization for Standardization
- International Electrotechnical Commission

== Overview of websites related to SC36 ==
- SC36 in ISO
- SC36 in IEC
- SC36 in JTC1(1)
- SC36 in JTC1(2)
