= List of ISO standards 10000–11999 =

This is a list of published (Note: This list generally excludes draft versions.) International Organization for Standardization (ISO) standards and other deliverables. (Note: ISO deliverables include "specifications" (ISO/PAS, ISO/TS), "reports" (ISO/TR), etc, which are not referred to by ISO as "standards".) For a complete and up-to-date list of all the ISO standards, see the ISO catalogue.

The standards are protected by copyright and most of them must be purchased. However, about 300 of the standards produced by ISO and IEC's Joint Technical Committee 1 (JTC 1) have been made freely and publicly available.

== ISO 10000 – ISO 10999 ==
- ISO/IEC TR 10000 Information technology – Framework and taxonomy of International Standardized Profiles
  - ISO/IEC TR 10000-1:1998 Part 1: General principles and documentation framework
  - ISO/IEC TR 10000-2:1998 Part 2: Principles and Taxonomy for OSI Profiles
  - ISO/IEC TR 10000-3:1998 Part 3: Principles and Taxonomy for Open System Environment Profiles
- ISO 10001:2007 Quality management – Customer satisfaction – Guidelines for codes of conduct for organizations
- ISO 10002:2014 Quality management – Customer satisfaction – Guidelines for complaints handling in organizations (Note: Originally ISO 10002:2004.)
- ISO 10003:2007 Quality management – Customer satisfaction – Guidelines for dispute resolution external to organizations
- ISO 10004:2008 Quality management – Customer satisfaction – Guidelines for monitoring and measuring
- ISO 10005:2005 Quality management systems – Guidelines for quality plans
- ISO 10006:2003 Quality management systems – Guidelines for quality management in projects
- ISO 10007:2017 Quality management systems – Guidelines for configuration management
- ISO 10008:2013 Quality management – Customer satisfaction – Guidelines for business-to-consumer electronic commerce transactions
- ISO 10012:2003 Measurement management systems – Requirements for measurement processes and measuring equipment
- ISO/TR 10013:2001 Guidelines for quality management system documentation
- ISO 10014:2006 Quality management – Guidelines for realizing financial and economic benefits
- ISO 10015:1999 Quality management – Guidelines for training
- ISO/TR 10017:2003 Guidance on statistical techniques for ISO 9001:2000
- ISO 10018:2012 Quality management – Guidelines on people involvement and competence
- ISO 10019:2005 Guidelines for the selection of quality management system consultants and use of their services
- ISO/IEC 10021 Information technology – Message Handling Systems (MHS)
- ISO/IEC 10022:1996 Information technology – Open Systems Interconnection – Physical Service Definition
- ISO/IEC 10026 Information technology – Open Systems Interconnection – Distributed Transaction Processing
  - ISO/IEC 10026-1:1998 Part 1: OSI TP Model
  - ISO/IEC 10026-2:1998 Part 2: OSI TP Service
  - ISO/IEC 10026-3:1998 Part 3: Protocol specification
  - ISO/IEC 10026-4:1995 Protocol Implementation Conformance Statement (PICS) proforma
  - ISO/IEC 10026-5:1998 Part 5: Application context proforma and guidelines when using OSI TP
  - ISO/IEC 10026-6:1995 Part 6: Unstructured Data Transfer
- ISO/IEC 10027:1990 Information technology – Information Resource Dictionary System (IRDS) framework
- ISO/IEC 10028:1993 Information technology – Telecommunications and information exchange between systems – Definition of the relaying functions of a Network layer intermediate system
- ISO/IEC 10030:1995 Information technology – Telecommunications and information exchange between systems – End System Routing Information Exchange Protocol for use in conjunction with ISO/IEC 8878
- ISO/IEC TR 10032:2003 Information technology – Reference Model of Data Management
- ISO/IEC TR 10034:1990 Guidelines for the preparation of conformity clauses in programming language standards
- ISO/IEC 10035 Information technology – Open Systems Interconnection – Connectionless protocol for the Association Control Service Element
  - ISO/IEC 10035-2:1995 Protocol Implementation Conformance Statement (PICS) proforma
- ISO/IEC 10036:1996 Information technology - Font information interchange - Procedures for registration of font-related identifiers
- ISO/IEC 10040:1998 Information technology – Open Systems Interconnection – Systems management overview
- ISO 10052:2004 Acoustics – Field measurements of airborne and impact sound insulation and of service equipment sound – Survey method
- ISO 10055:1996 Mechanical vibration - Vibration testing requirements for shipboard equipment and machinery components
- ISO 10075 Ergonomic principles related to mental workload
  - ISO 10075-1:2017 Part 1: General issues and concepts, terms and definitions
- ISO 10077 Thermal performance of windows, doors and shutters – Calculation of thermal transmittance
- ISO 10079 Medical suction equipment
  - ISO 10079-1:2015 Part 1: Electrically powered suction equipment
  - ISO 10079-2:2014 Part 2: Manually powered suction equipment
  - ISO 10079-3:2014 Part 3: Suction equipment powered from a vacuum or positive pressure gas source
- ISO/IEC 10089:1991 Information technology – 130 mm rewritable optical disk cartridge for information interchange
- ISO/IEC 10090:1992 Information technology – 90 mm optical disk cartridges, rewritable and read only, for data interchange
- ISO/IEC TR 10091:1995 Information technology – Technical aspects of 130 mm optical disk cartridge write-once recording format
- ISO 10110 Optics and photonics – Preparation of drawings for optical elements and systems (Note: The exact wording of this title varies between parts. This is the wording of the most recently published part.)
  - ISO 10110-1:2006 Part 1: General
  - ISO 10110-2:1996 Part 2: Material imperfections – Stress birefringence
  - ISO 10110-3:1996 Part 3: Material imperfections – Bubbles and inclusions
  - ISO 10110-4:1997 Part 4: Material imperfections – Inhomogeneity and striae
  - ISO 10110-5:2015 Part 5: Surface form tolerances
  - ISO 10110-6:2015 Part 6: Centring tolerances
  - ISO 10110-7:2017 Part 7: Surface imperfections
  - ISO 10110-8:2010 Part 8: Surface texture; roughness and waviness
  - ISO 10110-9:2016 Part 9: Surface treatment and coating
  - ISO 10110-10:2004 Part 10: Table representing data of optical elements and cemented assemblies
  - ISO 10110-11:2016 Part 11: Non-toleranced data
  - ISO 10110-12:2007 Part 12: Aspheric surfaces
  - ISO 10110-14:2007 Part 14: Wavefront deformation tolerance
  - ISO 10110-17:2004 Part 17: Laser irradiation damage threshold
  - ISO 10110-19:2015 Part 19: General description of surfaces and components
- ISO 10112:1991 Damping materials – Graphical presentation of the complex modulus
- ISO/IEC 10116 Information technology – Security techniques – Modes of operation for an n-bit block cipher
- ISO/IEC 10118 Information technology – Security techniques – Hash-functions
  - ISO/IEC 10118-1:2016 Part 1: General
  - ISO/IEC 10118-2:2010 Part 2: Hash-functions using an n-bit block cipher
  - ISO/IEC 10118-3:2004 Part 3: Dedicated hash-functions
  - ISO/IEC 10118-4:1998 Part 4: Hash-functions using modular arithmetic
- ISO 10132:1993 Textiles – Textured filament yarn – Definitions
- ISO 10135:2007 Geometrical product specifications (GPS) – Drawing indications for moulded parts in technical product documentation (TPD)
- ISO/IEC 10149:1995 Information technology - Data interchange on read-only 120 mm optical data disks (CD-ROM)
- ISO 10159:2011 Health informatics – Messages and communication – Web access reference manifest
- ISO 10160:2015 Information and documentation – Open Systems Interconnection – Interlibrary Loan Application Service Definition
- ISO 10161 Information and documentation – Open Systems Interconnection – Interlibrary Loan Application Protocol Specification
  - ISO 10161-1:2014 Part 1: Protocol specification
  - ISO 10161-2:2014 Part 2: Protocol implementation conformance statement (PICS) proforma
- ISO/IEC 10164 Information technology – Open Systems Interconnection – Systems Management
  - ISO/IEC 10164-1:1993 Object Management Function
  - ISO/IEC 10164-2:1993 State Management Function
  - ISO/IEC 10164-3:1993 Attributes for representing relationships
  - ISO/IEC 10164-4:1992 Alarm reporting function
  - ISO/IEC 10164-5:1993 Event Report Management Function
  - ISO/IEC 10164-6:1993 Log control function
  - ISO/IEC 10164-7:1992 Security alarm reporting function
  - ISO/IEC 10164-8:1993 Security audit trail function
  - ISO/IEC 10164-9:1995 Objects and attributes for access control
  - ISO/IEC 10164-10:1995 Usage metering function for accounting purposes
  - ISO/IEC 10164-11:1994 Metric objects and attributes
  - ISO/IEC 10164-12:1994 Test Management Function
  - ISO/IEC 10164-13:1995 Summarization Function
  - ISO/IEC 10164-14:1996 Confidence and diagnostic test categories
  - ISO/IEC 10164-15:2002 Scheduling function
  - ISO/IEC 10164-16:1997 Management knowledge management function
  - ISO/IEC 10164-17:1996 Change over function
  - ISO/IEC 10164-18:1997 Software management function
  - ISO/IEC 10164-19:1998 Management domain and management policy management function
  - ISO/IEC 10164-20:1999 Time management function
  - ISO/IEC 10164-21:1998 Command sequencer for Systems Managenment
  - ISO/IEC 10164-22:2000 Response time monitoring
- ISO/IEC 10165 Information technology – Open Systems Interconnection – Structure of management information
  - ISO/IEC 10165-1:1993 Management Information Model
  - ISO/IEC 10165-2:1992 Definition of management information
  - ISO/IEC 10165-4:1992 Part 4: Guidelines for the definition of managed objects
  - ISO/IEC 10165-5:1994 Generic management information
  - ISO/IEC 10165-6:1997 Requirements and guidelines for implementation conformance statement proformas associated with OSI management
  - ISO/IEC 10165-7:1996 General relationship model
  - ISO/IEC 10165-8:2000 Managed objects for supporting upper layers
  - ISO/IEC 10165-9:2000 Systems management application layer managed objects
- ISO/IEC 10166 Information technology – Text and office systems – Document Filing and Retrieval (DFR)
  - ISO/IEC 10166-1:1991 Part 1: Abstract service definition and procedures
  - ISO/IEC 10166-2:1991 Part 2: Protocol specification
- ISO/IEC TR 10171:2000 Information technology – Telecommunications and information exchange between systems – List of standard data link layer protocols that utilize high-level data link control (HDLC) classes of procedures, list of standard XID format identifiers, list of standard mode-setting information field format identifiers, and list of standard user-defined parameter set identification values
- ISO/IEC 10173:1998 Information technology – Telecommunications and information exchange between systems – Interface connector and contact assignments for ISDN primary rate access connector located at reference points S and T
- ISO/IEC 10175 Information technology – Text and office systems – Document Printing Application (DPA)
  - ISO/IEC 10175-1:1996 Part 1: Abstract service definition and procedures
  - ISO/IEC 10175-2:1996 Part 2: Protocol specification
  - ISO/IEC 10175-3:2000 Part 3: Management abstract service definitions and procedures
- ISO/IEC TR 10176:2003 Information technology - Guidelines for the preparation of programming language standards
- ISO/IEC 10177:1993 Information technology – Telecommunications and information exchange between systems – Provision of the connection-mode Network internal layer service by intermediate systems using ISO/IEC 8208, the X.25 Packet Layer Protocol
- ISO/IEC 10179:1996 Information technology – Processing languages – Document Style Semantics and Specification Language (DSSSL)
- ISO/IEC 10180:1995 Information technology - Processing languages - Standard Page Description Language (SPDL)
- ISO/IEC 10181 Information technology - Open Systems Interconnection - Security frameworks for open systems
  - ISO/IEC 10181-1:1996 Overview
  - ISO/IEC 10181-2:1996 Authentication framework
  - ISO/IEC 10181-3:1996 Access control framework
  - ISO/IEC 10181-4:1997 Non-repudiation framework
  - ISO/IEC 10181-5:1996 Confidentiality framework
  - ISO/IEC 10181-6:1996 Integrity framework
  - ISO/IEC 10181-7:1996 Security audit and alarms framework
- ISO/IEC TR 10182:2016 Information technology - Programming languages, their environments and system software interfaces - Guidelines for language bindings
- ISO/IEC TR 10183 Information technology – Text and office systems – Office Document Architecture (ODA) and interchange format – Technical Report on ISO 8613 implementation testing
  - ISO/IEC TR 10183-1:1993 Part 1: Testing methodology
  - ISO/IEC TR 10183-2:1993 Part 2: Framework for abstract test cases
- ISO/IEC 10192 Information technology - Home Electronic System (HES) interfaces
  - ISO/IEC 10192-1:2002 Part 1: Universal Interface (UI) Class 1
  - ISO/IEC TR 10192-2:2000 Part 2: Simple Interfaces Type 1
- ISO/IEC 10206:1991 Information technology – Programming languages – Extended Pascal
- ISO 10209:2012 Technical product documentation - Vocabulary - Terms relating to technical drawings, product definition and related documentation
- ISO 10211 Thermal bridges in building construction – Heat flows and surface temperatures – Detailed calculations
- ISO 10218 Robots and robotic devices – Safety requirements for industrial robots
- ISO 10241 Terminological entries in standards
  - ISO 10241-1:2011 Part 1: General requirements and examples of presentation
  - ISO 10241-2:2012 Part 2: Adoption of standardized terminological entries
- ISO 10243:2010 Tools for pressing – Compression springs with rectangular section – Housing dimensions and colour coding
- ISO 10244:2010 Document management - Business process baselining and analysis
- ISO 10254:2016 Air cargo and ground equipment – Vocabulary
- ISO/TR 10255:2009 Document management applications - Optical disk storage technology, management and standards
- ISO 10263 Earth-moving machinery – Operator enclosure environment
  - ISO 10263-1:2009 Part 1: Terms and definitions
- ISO 10265:2008 Earth-moving machinery - Crawler machines - Performance requirements and test procedures for braking systems
- ISO 10272 Microbiology of the food chain – Horizontal method for detection and enumeration of Campylobacter spp.
  - ISO 10272-1:2017 Part 1: Detection method
  - ISO 10272-2:2017 Part 2: Colony-count technique
- ISO 10273:2017 Microbiology of the food chain - Horizontal method for the detection of pathogenic Yersinia enterocolitica
- ISO/IEC 10279:1991 Information technology – Programming languages – Full BASIC
- ISO 10284:1997 Cinematography - Graphical symbols - Description
- ISO 10286:2015 Gas cylinders - Terminology
- ISO 10302 Acoustics – Measurement of airborne noise emitted and structure-borne vibration induced by small air-moving devices
  - ISO 10302-1:2011 Part 1: Airborne noise measurement
  - ISO 10302-2:2011 Part 2: Structure-borne vibration measurements
- ISO 10303 Industrial automation systems and integration – Product data representation and exchange
- ISO 10316:1990 Shipbuilding — Class B magnetic compasses — Tests and certification [Withdrawn: replaced by ISO 25862]
- ISO 10318 Geosynthetics
  - ISO 10318-1:2015 Part 1: Terms and definitions
  - ISO 10318-2:2015 Part 2: Symbols and pictograms
- ISO 10322 Ophthalmic optics – Semi-finished spectacle lens blanks
  - ISO 10322-1:2016 Part 1: Specifications for single-vision and multifocal lens blanks
  - ISO 10322-2:2016 Part 2: Specifications for progressive-power and degressive-power lens blanks
- ISO 10324:1997 Information and documentation - Holdings statements - Summary level
- ISO 10328:2016 Prosthetics – Structural testing of lower-limb prostheses – Requirements and test methods
- ISO 10334:1994 Implants for surgery – Malleable wires for use as sutures and other surgical applications
- ISO 10341:2012 Ophthalmic instruments – Refractor heads
- ISO 10342:2010 Ophthalmic instruments – Eye refractometers
- ISO 10343:2014 Ophthalmic instruments – Ophthalmometers
- ISO 10360 Geometrical Product Specifications (GPS) - Acceptance and reverification tests for coordinate measuring systems (CMS)
  - ISO 10360-1:2000 Part 1: Vocabulary
  - ISO 10360-2:2009 Part 2: CMMs used for measuring linear dimensions
  - ISO 10360-3:2000 Part 3: CMMs with the axis of a rotary table as the fourth axis
  - ISO 10360-4:2000 Part 4: CMMs used in scanning measuring mode
  - ISO 10360-5:2010 Part 5: CMMs using single and multiple stylus contacting probing systems
  - ISO 10360-6:2001 Part 6: Estimation of errors in computing Gaussian associated features
  - ISO 10360-7:2011 Part 7: CMMs equipped with imaging probing systems
  - ISO 10360-8:2013 Part 8: CMMs with optical distance sensors
  - ISO 10360-9:2013 Part 9: CMMs with multiple probing systems
  - ISO 10360-10:2016 Part 10: Laser trackers for measuring point-to-point distances
  - ISO 10360-12:2016 Part 12: Articulated arm coordinate measurement machines (CMM)
- ISO/IEC 10367:1991 Information technology - Standardized coded graphic character sets for use in 8-bit codes
- ISO/IEC 10373 Identification cards – Test methods
  - ISO/IEC 10373-1:2006 Part 1: General characteristics
  - ISO/IEC 10373-2:2015 Part 2: Cards with magnetic stripes
  - ISO/IEC 10373-3:2010 Part 3: Integrated circuit cards with contacts and related interface devices
  - ISO/IEC 10373-5:2014 Part 5: Optical memory cards
  - ISO/IEC 10373-6:2016 Part 6: Proximity cards
  - ISO/IEC 10373-7:2008 Part 7: Vicinity cards
  - ISO/IEC 10373-8:2011 Part 8: USB-ICC
  - ISO/IEC 10373-9:2011 Part 9: Optical memory cards - Holographic recording method
- ISO 10377:2013 Consumer product safety – Guidelines for suppliers
- ISO 10380 Pipework — Corrugated metal hoses and hose assemblies
- ISO 10383:2012 Securities and related financial instruments – Codes for exchanges and market identification (MIC)
- ISO 10386:1994 Ferroboron - Specification and conditions of delivery
- ISO 10387:1994 Metal chrome - Specification and conditions of delivery
- ISO 10393:2013 Consumer product recall – Guidelines for suppliers
- ISO 10456 Building materials and products – Hygrothermal properties – Tabulated design values and procedures for determining declared and design thermal values
- ISO 10487 Passenger cars – Connections for car radios
- ISO 10494:1993 Gas turbines and gas turbine sets – Measurement of emitted airborne noise – Engineering/survey method
- ISO/IEC 10514 Information technology - Programming languages
  - ISO/IEC 10514-1:1996 Part 1: Modula-2, Base Language
  - ISO/IEC 10514-2:1998 Part 2: Generics Modula-2
  - ISO/IEC 10514-3:1998 Part 3: Object Oriented Modula-2
- ISO 10524 Pressure regulators for use with medical gases
  - ISO 10524-1:2006 Part 1: Pressure regulators and pressure regulators with flow-metering devices
  - ISO 10524-2:2005 Part 2: Manifold and line pressure regulators
  - ISO 10524-3:2005 Part 3: Pressure regulators integrated with cylinder valves
  - ISO 10524-4:2008 Part 4: Low-pressure regulators
- ISO 10534 Acoustics – Determination of sound absorption coefficient and impedance in impedance tubes
  - ISO 10534-1:1996 Part 1: Method using standing wave ratio
  - ISO 10534-2:1998 Part 2: Transfer-function method
- ISO/IEC 10536 Identification cards – Contactless integrated circuit(s) cards – Close-coupled cards
  - ISO/IEC 10536-1:2000 Part 1: Physical characteristics
  - ISO/IEC 10536-2:1995 Part 2: Dimensions and location of coupling areas
  - ISO/IEC 10536-3:1996 Part 3: Electronic signals and reset procedures
- ISO/IEC 10538:1991 Information technology - Control functions for text communication
- ISO 10555 Intravascular catheters – Sterile and single-use catheters
  - ISO 10555-1:2013 Part 1: General requirements
  - ISO 10555-3:2013 Part 3: Central venous catheters
  - ISO 10555-4:2013 Part 4: Balloon dilatation catheters
  - ISO 10555-5:2013 Part 5: Over-needle peripheral catheters
  - ISO 10555-6:2015 Part 6: Subcutaneous implanted ports
- ISO/IEC 10561:1999 Information technology - Office equipment - Printing devices - Method for measuring throughput - Class 1 and Class 2 printers
- ISO 10567:2007 Earth-moving machinery - Hydraulic excavators - Lift capacity
- ISO 10576 Statistical methods - Guidelines for the evaluation of conformity with specified requirements
  - ISO 10576-1:2003 Part 1: General principles
- ISO 10579:2010 Geometrical product specifications (GPS) – Dimensioning and tolerancing – Non-rigid parts
- ISO 10585:1996 Information and documentation - Armenian alphabet coded character set for bibliographic information interchange
- ISO 10586:1996 Information and documentation - Georgian alphabet coded character set for bibliographic information interchange
- ISO/IEC 10588:1993 Information technology – Use of X.25 Packet Layer Protocol in conjunction with X.21/X.21 bis to provide the OSI connection-mode Network Service
- ISO/IEC 10589:2002 Information technology – Telecommunications and information exchange between systems – Intermediate System to Intermediate System intra-domain routeing information exchange protocol for use in conjunction with the protocol for providing the connectionless-mode network service (ISO 8473)
- ISO 10625:2005 Equipment for crop protection – Sprayer nozzles – Colour coding for identification
- ISO 10628 Flow diagrams for process plants
- ISO/IEC 10641:1993 Information technology - Computer graphics and image processing - Conformance testing of implementations of graphics standards
- ISO/IEC 10646:2020 Information technology — Universal Coded Character Set (UCS)
- ISO 10651 Lung ventilators for medical use – Particular requirements for basic safety and essential performance
  - ISO 10651-1:1993 Part 1: Requirements
  - ISO 10651-2:1996 Part 2: Particular requirements for home care ventilators
  - ISO 10651-3:1997 Part 3: Particular requirements for emergency and transport ventilators
  - ISO 10651-4:2002 Part 4: Particular requirements for operator-powered resuscitators
  - ISO 10651-5:2006 Part 5: Gas-powered emergency resuscitators
  - ISO 10651-6:2004 Part 6: Home-care ventilatory support devices
- ISO 10656:2016 Resistance welding equipment – Transformers – Integrated transformers for welding guns
- ISO 10664 Hexalobular internal driving feature for bolts and screws – Torx screw head
- ISO 10667 Assessment service delivery – Procedures and methods to assess people in work and organizational settings
  - ISO 10667-1:2011 Part 1: Requirements for the client
  - ISO 10667-2:2011 Part 2: Requirements for service providers
- ISO 10668:2010 Brand valuation - Requirements for monetary brand valuation
- ISO 10685 Ophthalmic optics – Spectacle frames and sunglasses electronic catalogue and identification
  - ISO 10685-1:2011 Part 1: Product identification and electronic catalogue product hierarchy
  - ISO 10685-2:2016 Part 2: Commercial information
  - ISO 10685-3:2012 Part 3: Technical information
- ISO 10703:2007 Water quality - Determination of the activity concentration of radionuclides - Method by high resolution gamma-ray spectrometry
- ISO 10705 Water quality – Detection and enumeration of bacteriophages
  - ISO 10705-1:1995 Part 1: Enumeration of F-specific RNA bacteriophages
  - ISO 10705-2:2000 Part 2: Enumeration of somatic coliphages
  - ISO 10705-3:2003 Part 3: Validation of methods for concentration of bacteriophages from water
  - ISO 10705-4:2001 Part 4: Enumeration of bacteriophages infecting Bacteroides fragilis
- ISO 10711:2012 Intelligent Transport Systems – Interface Protocol and Message Set Definition between Traffic Signal Controllers and Detectors
- ISO 10718:2015 Cork stoppers – Characterization of a low-in-germs stopper, through the enumeration of colony-forming units of yeasts, moulds and bacteria, capable of both being extracted and growing in alcoholic medium
- ISO 10725:2000 Acceptance sampling plans and procedures for the inspection of bulk materials
- ISO/IEC 10728:1993 Information technology – Information Resource Dictionary System (IRDS) Services Interface
- ISO/IEC 10731:1994 Information technology - Open Systems Interconnection - Basic Reference Model - Conventions for the definition of OSI services
- ISO/IEC 10732:1993 Information technology – Use of X.25 Packet Layer Protocol to provide the OSI connection-mode Network Service over the telephone network
- ISO/IEC 10733:1998 Information technology – Elements of management information related to the OSI Network Layer
- ISO/IEC 10736:1995 Information technology – Telecommunications and information exchange between systems – Transport layer security protocol
- ISO/IEC 10737:1998 Information technology – Elements of management information related to OSI Transport layer
- ISO/IEC 10741 Information technology – User system interfaces – Dialogue interaction
  - ISO/IEC 10741-1:1995 Part 1: Cursor control for text editing
- ISO/IEC 10742:1994 Information technology – Telecommunications and information exchange between systems – Elements of management information related to OSI Data Link Layer standards
- ISO/IEC 10744:1997 Information technology - Hypermedia/Time-based Structuring Language (HyTime)
- ISO/IEC 10745:1995 Information technology - Open Systems Interconnection - Upper layers security model
- ISO/IEC 10746 Information technology—Open Distributed Processing—Reference model
  - ISO/IEC 10746-1:1998 Overview
  - ISO/IEC 10746-2:2009 Foundations
  - ISO/IEC 10746-3:2009 Architecture
  - ISO/IEC 10746-4:1998 Architectural semantics
- ISO/IEC 10747:1994 Information technology – Telecommunications and information exchange between systems – Protocol for exchange of inter-domain routeing information among intermediate systems to support forwarding of ISO 8473 PDUs
- ISO 10754:1996 Information and documentation - Extension of the Cyrillic alphabet coded character set for non-Slavic languages for bibliographic information interchange
- ISO/IEC 10779:2008 Information technology – Office equipment accessibility guidelines for elderly persons and persons with disabilities
- ISO/HL7 10781:2015 Health Informatics – HL7 Electronic Health Records-System Functional Model, Release 2 (EHR FM)
- ISO 10782 Definitions and attributes of data elements for control and monitoring of textile processes
  - ISO 10782-1:1998 Part 1: Spinning, spinning preparatory and related processes
- ISO 10790:2015 Measurement of fluid flow in closed conduits – Guidance to the selection, installation and use of Coriolis flowmeters (mass flow, density and volume flow measurements)
- ISO 10795:2011 Space systems – Programme management and quality – Vocabulary
- ISO/TS 10797:2012 Nanotechnologies – Characterization of single-wall carbon nanotubes using transmission electron microscopy
- ISO/TS 10798:2011 Nanotechnologies – Characterization of single-wall carbon nanotubes using scanning electron microscopy and energy dispersive X-ray spectrometry analysis
- ISO 10801:2010 Nanotechnologies – Generation of metal nanoparticles for inhalation toxicity testing using the evaporation/condensation method
- ISO 10807:1994 Pipework - Corrugated flexible metallic hose assemblies for the protection of electrical cables in explosive atmospheres
- ISO 10808:2010 Nanotechnologies – Characterization of nanoparticles in inhalation exposure chambers for inhalation toxicity testing
- ISO/TS 10811 Mechanical vibration and shock – Vibration and shock in buildings with sensitive equipment
  - ISO/TS 10811-1:2000 Part 1: Measurement and evaluation
  - ISO/TS 10811-2:2000 Part 2: Classification
- ISO 10813 Vibration generating machines – Guidance for selection
  - ISO 10813-1:2004 Part 1: Equipment for environmental testing
- ISO 10815:2016 Mechanical vibration – Measurement of vibration generated internally in railway tunnels by the passage of trains
- ISO 10816 Mechanical vibration - Evaluation of machine vibration by measurements on non-rotating parts
  - ISO 10816-1:1995 Part 1: General guidelines
  - ISO 10816-2:2009 Part 2: Land-based steam turbines and generators in excess of 50 MW with normal operating speeds of 1 500 r/min, 1 800 r/min, 3 000 r/min and 3 600 r/min
  - ISO 10816-3:2009 Part 3: Industrial machines with nominal power above 15 kW and nominal speeds between 120 r/min and 15 000 r/min when measured in situ
  - ISO 10816-4:2009 Part 4: Gas turbine sets with fluid-film bearings
  - ISO 10816-5:2000 Part 5: Machine sets in hydraulic power generating and pumping plants
  - ISO 10816-6:1995 Part 6: Reciprocating machines with power ratings above 100 kW
  - ISO 10816-7:2009 Part 7: Rotodynamic pumps for industrial applications, including measurements on rotating shafts
  - ISO 10816-8:2014 Part 8: Reciprocating compressor systems
  - ISO 10816-21:2015 Part 21: Horizontal axis wind turbines with gearbox
- ISO 10817 Rotating shaft vibration measuring systems
  - ISO 10817-1:1998 Part 1: Relative and absolute sensing of radial vibration
- ISO 10825:1995 Gears - Wear and damage to gear teeth - Terminology
- ISO 10843:1997 Acoustics – Methods for the description and physical measurement of single impulses or series of impulses
- ISO 10844:2014 Acoustics – Specification of test tracks for measuring noise emitted by road vehicles and their tyres
- ISO 10846 Acoustics and vibration – Laboratory measurement of vibro-acoustic transfer properties of resilient elements
  - ISO 10846-1:2008 Part 1: Principles and guidelines
  - ISO 10846-2:2008 Part 2: Direct method for determination of the dynamic stiffness of resilient supports for translatory motion
  - ISO 10846-3:2002 Part 3: Indirect method for determination of the dynamic stiffness of resilient supports for translatory motion
  - ISO 10846-4:2003 Part 4: Dynamic stiffness of elements other than resilient supports for translatory motion
  - ISO 10846-5:2008 Part 5: Driving point method for determination of the low-frequency transfer stiffness of resilient supports for translatory motion
- ISO 10847:1997 Acoustics – In-situ determination of insertion loss of outdoor noise barriers of all types
- ISO/IEC 10859:1997 Information technology - 8-bit backplane interface: STEbus and mechanical core specifications for microcomputers
- ISO/IEC 10861:1994 Information technology - Microprocessor systems - High-performance synchronous 32-bit bus: MULTIBUS II
- ISO/TS 10867:2010 Nanotechnologies – Characterization of single-wall carbon nanotubes using near infrared photoluminescence spectroscopy
- ISO/TS 10868:2017 Nanotechnologies – Characterization of single-wall carbon nanotubes using ultraviolet-visible-near infrared (UV-Vis-NIR) absorption spectroscopy
- ISO 10878:2013 Non-destructive testing - Infrared thermography - Vocabulary
- ISO/IEC 10885:1993 Information technology - 356 mm optical disk cartridge for information interchange - Write once
- ISO/IEC 10918 Information technology - Digital compression and coding of continuous-tone still images
- ISO/TR 10929:2012 Nanotechnologies – Characterization of multiwall carbon nanotube (MWCNT) samples
- ISO 10934 Optics and optical instruments - Vocabulary for microscopy
  - ISO 10934-1:2002 Part 1: Light microscopy
  - ISO 10934-2:2007 Part 2: Advanced techniques in light microscopy
- ISO 10936 Optics and photonics – Operation microscopes
  - ISO 10936-1:2017 Part 1: Requirements and test methods
  - ISO 10936-2:2010 Part 2: Light hazard from operation microscopes used in ocular surgery
- ISO 10938:2016 Ophthalmic optics – Chart displays for visual acuity measurement – Printed, projected and electronic
- ISO 10939:2017 Ophthalmic instruments – Slit-lamp microscopes
- ISO 10940:2009 Ophthalmic instruments – Fundus cameras
- ISO 10942:2006 Ophthalmic instruments – Direct ophthalmoscopes
- ISO 10943:2011 Ophthalmic instruments – Indirect ophthalmoscopes
- ISO 10944:2009 Ophthalmic instruments – Synoptophores
- ISO 10957:2009 Information and documentation – International standard music number (ISMN)
- ISO 10962:2015 Securities and related financial instruments – Classification of financial instruments (CFI code)
- ISO/IEC 10967 Information technology – Language independent arithmetic
- ISO/TS 10974:2012 Assessment of the safety of magnetic resonance imaging for patients with an active implantable medical device
- ISO 10985:2009 Caps made of aluminium-plastics combinations for infusion bottles and injection vials – Requirements and test methods
- ISO 10991:2009 Micro process engineering – Vocabulary
- ISO/TR 10992:2011 Intelligent transport systems – Use of nomadic and portable devices to support ITS service and multimedia provision in vehicles
- ISO 10993 Biological evaluation of medical devices
- ISO/IEC 10994:1992 Information technology – Data interchange on 90 mm flexible disk cartridges using modified frequency modulation recording at 31 831 ftprad on 80 tracks on each side – ISO Type 303
- ISO/IEC 10995:2011 Information technology - Digitally recorded media for information interchange and storage - Test method for the estimation of the archival lifetime of optical media

== ISO 11000 – ISO 11999 ==
- ISO/IEC 11002:2008 Information technology - Multipath management API
- ISO 11005:2010 Technical product documentation – Use of main documents
- ISO 11011:2013 Compressed air - Energy efficiency - Assessment
- ISO 11014:2009 Safety data sheet for chemical products - Content and order of sections
- ISO/IEC TR 11017:1998 Information technology - Framework for internationalization
- ISO 11040 Prefilled syringes
  - ISO 11040-1:2015 Part 1: Glass cylinders for dental local anaesthetic cartridges
  - ISO 11040-2:2011 Part 2: Plunger stoppers for dental local anaesthetic cartridges
  - ISO 11040-3:2012 Part 3: Seals for dental local anaesthetic cartridges
  - ISO 11040-4:2015 Part 4: Glass barrels for injectables and sterilized subassembled syringes ready for filling
  - ISO 11040-5:2012 Part 5: Plunger stoppers for injectables
  - ISO 11040-6:2012 Part 6: Plastic barrels for injectables
  - ISO 11040-7:2015 Part 7: Packaging systems for sterilized subassembled syringes ready for filling
  - ISO 11040-8:2016 Part 8: Requirements and test methods for finished prefilled syringes
- ISO 11064 Ergonomic design of control centres
  - ISO 11064-1:2000 Principles for the design of control centres
  - ISO 11064-2:2000 Principles for the arrangement of control suites
  - ISO 11064-3:1999 Control room layout ISO 11064-3:1999/Cor 1:2002
  - ISO 11064-4:2013 Layout and dimensions of workstations
  - ISO 11064-5:2008 Displays and controls
  - ISO 11064-6:2005 Environmental requirements for control centres
  - ISO 11064-7:2006 Principles for the evaluation of control centres
- ISO/TR 11065:1992 Industrial automation glossary
- ISO 11067:2015 Intelligent transport systems – Curve speed warning systems (CSWS) – Performance requirements and test procedures
- ISO 11070:2014 Sterile single-use intravascular introducers, dilators and guidewires
- ISO/IEC 11072:1992 Information technology - Computer graphics - Computer Graphics Reference Model
- ISO/IEEE 11073 Health informatics - Point-of-care medical device communication
- ISO 11074:2015 Soil quality - Vocabulary
- ISO 11086:1996 Gas turbines - Vocabulary
- ISO 11091:1994 Construction drawings – Landscape drawing practice
- ISO 11095:1996 Linear calibration using reference materials
- ISO 11107:2009 Recreational diving services – Requirements for training programmes on enriched air nitrox (EAN) diving
- ISO 11108:1996 Information and documentation - Archival paper - Requirements for permanence and durability
- ISO 11117:2008 Gas cylinders – Valve protection caps and valve guards – Design, construction and tests
- ISO 11120 Gas cylinders - Refillable seamless steel tubes of water capacity between 150 L and 3000 L - Design, construction and testing
- ISO 11121:2017 Recreational diving services – Requirements for introductory programmes to scuba diving
- ISO 11124 Preparation of steel substrates before application of paints and related products - Specifications for metallic blast-cleaning abrasives
  - ISO 11124-1:1993 Part 1: General introduction and classification
  - ISO 11124-2:1993 Part 2: Chilled-iron grit
  - ISO 11124-3:1993 Part 3: High-carbon cast-steel shot and grit
  - ISO 11124-4:1993 Part 4: Low-carbon cast-steel shot
- ISO 11125 Preparation of steel substrates before application of paints and related products - Test methods for metallic blast-cleaning abrasives
  - ISO 11125-1:1993 Part 1: Sampling
  - ISO 11125-2:1993 Part 2: Determination of particle size distribution
  - ISO 11125-3:1993 Part 3: Determination of hardness
  - ISO 11125-4:1993 Part 4: Determination of apparent density
  - ISO 11125-5:1993 Part 5: Determination of percentage defective particles and of microstructure
  - ISO 11125-6:1993 Part 6: Determination of foreign matter
  - ISO 11125-7:1993 Part 7: Determination of moisture
- ISO 11126 Preparation of steel substrates before application of paints and related products - Specifications for non-metallic blast-cleaning abrasives
  - ISO 11126-1:1993 Part 1: General introduction and classification
  - ISO 11126-3:1993 Part 3: Copper refinery slag
  - ISO 11126-4:1993 Part 4: Coal furnace slag
  - ISO 11126-5:1993 Part 5: Nickel refinery slag
  - ISO 11126-6:1993 Part 6: Iron furnace slag
  - ISO 11126-7:1995 Part 7: Fused aluminium oxide
  - ISO 11126-8:1993 Part 8: Olivine sand
  - ISO 11126-9:1999 Part 9: Staurolite
  - ISO 11126-10:2000 Part 10: Almandite garnet
- ISO 11127 Preparation of steel substrates before application of paints and related products - Test methods for non-metallic blast-cleaning abrasives
  - ISO 11127-1:2011 Part 1: Sampling
  - ISO 11127-2:2011 Part 2: Determination of particle size distribution
  - ISO 11127-3:2011 Part 3: Determination of apparent density
  - ISO 11127-4:2011 Part 4: Assessment of hardness by a glass slide test
  - ISO 11127-5:2011 Part 5: Determination of moisture
  - ISO 11127-6:2011 Part 6: Determination of water-soluble contaminants by conductivity measurement
  - ISO 11127-7:2011 Part 7: Determination of water-soluble chlorides
- ISO 11133:2014 Microbiology of food, animal feed and water – Preparation, production, storage and performance testing of culture media
- ISO 11135:2014 Sterilization of health-care products—Ethylene oxide—Requirements for the development, validation and routine control of a sterilization process for medical devices
- ISO 11137 Sterilization of health care products – Radiation
- ISO 11138 Sterilization of health care products - Biological indicators
  - ISO 11138-1:2017 Part 1: General requirements
  - ISO 11138-2:2017 Part 2: Biological indicators for ethylene oxide sterilization processes
  - ISO 11138-3:2017 Part 3: Biological indicators for moist heat sterilization processes
  - ISO 11138-4:2017 Part 4: Biological indicators for dry heat sterilization processes
  - ISO 11138-5:2017 Part 5: Biological indicators for low-temperature steam and formaldehyde sterilization processes
- ISO/TS 11139:2006 Sterilization of health care products - Vocabulary
- ISO 11145:2016 Optics and photonics - Lasers and laser-related equipment - Vocabulary and symbols
- ISO 11146 Lasers and laser-related equipment – Test methods for laser beam widths, divergence angles and beam propagation ratios
  - ISO 11146-1:2005 Part 1: Stigmatic and simple astigmatic beams
  - ISO 11146-2:2005 Part 2: General astigmatic beams
  - ISO/TR 11146-3:2004 Part 3: Intrinsic and geometrical laser beam classification, propagation and details of test methods
- ISO 11151 Lasers and laser-related equipment – Standard optical components
  - ISO 11151-1:2015 Part 1: Components for the UV, visible and near-infrared spectral ranges
  - ISO 11151-2:2015 Part 2: Components for the infrared spectral range
- ISO 11156:2011 Packaging - Accessible design - General requirements
- ISO/IEC 11160 Information technology - Office equipment - Minimum information to be included in specification sheets - Printers
  - ISO/IEC 11160-1:1996 Part 1: Class 1 and Class 2 printers
  - ISO/IEC 11160-2:2013 Part 2: Class 3 and Class 4 printers
- ISO 11170:2003 Hydraulic fluid power – Filter elements – Sequence of tests for verifying performance characteristics
- ISO 11171:2010 Hydraulic fluid power – Calibration of automatic particle counters for liquids
- ISO/IEC 11172 Information technology – Coding of moving pictures and associated audio for digital storage media at up to about 1,5 Mbit/s
- ISO/IEC 11179 Information technology – Metadata registries (MDR)
- ISO 11192:2005 Small craft - Graphical symbols
- ISO 11195:1995 Gas mixers for medical use – Stand-alone gas mixers
- ISO 11197:2016 Medical supply units
- ISO 11200:2014 Acoustics – Noise emitted by machinery and equipment – Guidelines for the use of basic standards for the determination of emission sound pressure levels at a work station and at other specified positions
- ISO 11201:2010 Acoustics – Noise emitted by machinery and equipment – Determination of emission sound pressure levels at a work station and at other specified positions in an essentially free field over a reflecting plane with negligible environmental corrections
- ISO 11202:2010 Acoustics – Noise emitted by machinery and equipment – Determination of emission sound pressure levels at a work station and at other specified positions applying approximate environmental corrections
- ISO 11203:1995 Acoustics – Noise emitted by machinery and equipment – Determination of emission sound pressure levels at a work station and at other specified positions from the sound power level
- ISO 11204:2010 Acoustics – Noise emitted by machinery and equipment – Determination of emission sound pressure levels at a work station and at other specified positions applying accurate environmental corrections
- ISO 11205:2003 Acoustics – Noise emitted by machinery and equipment – Engineering method for the determination of emission sound pressure levels in situ at the work station and at other specified positions using sound intensity
- ISO/TR 11219:2012 Information and documentation - Qualitative conditions and basic statistics for library buildings - Space, function and design
- ISO 11224:2003 Textiles – Web formation and bonding in nonwovens – Vocabulary
- ISO 11238:2012 Health informatics – Identification of medicinal products – Data elements and structures for the unique identification and exchange of regulated information on substances
- ISO 11239:2012 Health informatics – Identification of medicinal products – Data elements and structures for the unique identification and exchange of regulated information on pharmaceutical dose forms, units of presentation, routes of administration and packaging
- ISO 11240:2012 Health informatics – Identification of medicinal products – Data elements and structures for the unique identification and exchange of units of measurement
- ISO/TS 11251:2010 Nanotechnologies – Characterization of volatile components in single-wall carbon nanotube samples using evolved gas analysis/gas chromatograph-mass spectrometry
- ISO 11252:2013 Lasers and laser-related equipment – Laser device – Minimum requirements for documentation
- ISO 11270:2014 Intelligent transport systems – Lane keeping assistance systems (LKAS) – Performance requirements and test procedures
- ISO 11290 Microbiology of the food chain - Horizontal method for the detection and enumeration of Listeria monocytogenes and of Listeria spp.
  - ISO 11290-1:2017 Part 1: Detection method
  - ISO 11290-2:2017 Part 2: Enumeration method
- ISO/TS 11308:2011 Nanotechnologies – Characterization of single-wall carbon nanotubes using thermogravimetric analysis
- ISO 11318:2002 Cardiac defibrillators – Connector assembly DF-1 for implantable defibrillators – Dimensions and test requirements
- ISO/IEC 11319:1993 Information technology – 8 mm wide magnetic tape cartridge for information interchange – Helical scan recording
- ISO/IEC 11321:1992 Information technology – 3,81 mm wide magnetic tape cartridge for information interchange – Helical scan recording – DATA/DAT format
- ISO 11323:2010 Iron ore and direct reduced iron – Vocabulary
- ISO/TR 11328:1994 Measurement of liquid flow in open channels – Equipment for the measurement of discharge under ice conditions
- ISO 11329:2001 Hydrometric determinations – Measurement of suspended sediment transport in tidal channels
- ISO 11357 Plastics – Differential scanning calorimetry (DSC)
  - ISO 11357-1:2009 General principles
  - ISO 11357-2:2013 Determination of glass transition temperature and glass transition step height
  - ISO 11357-3:2011 Determination of temperature and enthalpy of melting and crystallization
  - ISO 11357-4:2005 Determination of specific heat capacity
  - ISO 11357-5:2013 Determination of characteristic reaction-curve temperatures and times, enthalpy of reaction and degree of conversion
  - ISO 11357-6:2008 Determination of oxidation induction time (isothermal OIT) and oxidation induction temperature (dynamic OIT)
  - ISO 11357-7:2002 Determination of crystallization kinetics
- ISO/TR 11360:2010 Nanotechnologies – Methodology for the classification and categorization of nanomaterials
- ISO 11375:1998 Building construction machinery and equipment – Terms and definitions
- ISO 11380:1994 Optics and optical instruments – Ophthalmic optics – Formers
- ISO 11381:2016 Ophthalmic optics – Spectacle frames – Screw threads
- ISO 11400:1992 Nickel, ferronickel and nickel alloys - Determination of phosphorus content - Phosphovanadomolybdate molecular absorption spectrometric method
- ISO/IEC 11404:2007 Information technology – General-Purpose Datatypes (GPD)
- ISO/IEC 11411:1995 Information technology - Representation for human communication of state transition of software
- ISO 11418 Containers and accessories for pharmaceutical preparations
  - ISO 11418-1:2016 Part 1: Drop-dispensing glass bottles
  - ISO 11418-2:2016 Part 2: Screw-neck glass bottles for syrups
  - ISO 11418-3:2016 Part 3: Screw-neck glass bottles (veral) for solid and liquid dosage forms
  - ISO 11418-5:2015 Part 5: Dropper assemblies
  - ISO 11418-7:2016 Part 7: Screw-neck vials made of glass tubing for liquid dosage forms
- ISO 11421:1997 Optics and optical instruments - Accuracy of optical transfer function (OTF) measurement
- ISO 11442:2006 Technical product documentation – Document management
- ISO 11446:2004 Road vehicles – Connectors for the electrical connection of towing and towed vehicles – 13-pole connectors for vehicles with 12 V nominal supply voltage
- ISO 11450:1999 Equipment for harvesting and conservation – Round balers – Terminology and commercial specifications
- ISO 11451 Road vehicles – Vehicle test methods for electrical disturbances from narrowband radiated electromagnetic energy
  - ISO 11451-1:2015 Part 1: General principles and terminology
  - ISO 11451-2:2015 Part 2: Off-vehicle radiation sources
  - ISO 11451-3:2015 Part 3: On-board transmitter simulation
  - ISO 11451-4:2013 Part 4: Bulk current injection (BCI)
- ISO 11452 Road vehicles – Component test methods for electrical disturbances from narrowband radiated electromagnetic energy
  - ISO 11452-1:2015 Part 1: General principles and terminology
  - ISO 11452-2:2004 Part 2: Absorber-lined shielded enclosure
  - ISO 11452-3:2016 Part 3: Transverse electromagnetic (TEM) cell
  - ISO 11452-4:2011 Part 4: Harness excitation methods
  - ISO 11452-5:2002 Part 5: Stripline
  - ISO 11452-7:2003 Part 7: Direct radio frequency (RF) power injection
  - ISO 11452-8:2015 Part 8: Immunity to magnetic fields
  - ISO 11452-9:2012 Part 9: Portable transmitters
  - ISO 11452-10:2009 Part 10: Immunity to conducted disturbances in the extended audio frequency range
  - ISO 11452-11:2010 Part 11: Reverberation chamber
- ISO 11453:1996 Statistical interpretation of data - Tests and confidence intervals relating to proportions
- ISO/IEC 11458:1993 Information technology - Microprocessor systems - VICbus - Inter-crate cable bus
- ISO 11462 Guidelines for implementation of statistical process control (SPC)
  - ISO 11462-1:2001 Part 1: Elements of SPC
  - ISO 11462-2:2010 Part 2: Catalogue of tools and techniques
- ISO 11469:2000 Plastics – Generic identification and marking of plastics products
- ISO 11484:2009 Steel products – Employer's qualification system for non-destructive testing (NDT) personnel
- ISO 11485 Glass in building – Curved glass
  - ISO 11485-1:2011 Part 1: Terminology and definitions
- ISO/TR 11487:2008 Health informatics – Clinical stakeholder participation in the work of ISO TC 215
- ISO 11491:2017 Implants for surgery – Determination of impact resistance of ceramic femoral heads for hip joint prostheses
- ISO 11499:2014 Dentistry – Single-use cartridges for local anaesthetics
- ISO/IEC 11518 Information technology - High-Performance Parallel Interface
  - ISO/IEC 11518-1:1995 Part 1: Mechanical, electrical and signalling protocol specification (HIPPI-PH)
  - ISO/IEC 11518-2:2000 Part 2: Framing Protocol (HIPPI-FP)
  - ISO/IEC 11518-3:1996 Part 3: Encapsulation of ISO/IEC 8802-2 (IEEE Std 802.2) Logical Link Control Protocol Data Units (HIPPI-LE)
  - ISO/IEC 11518-6:2000 Part 6: Physical Switch Control (HIPPI-SC)
  - ISO/IEC 11518-9:1999 Part 9: Serial specification (HIPPI-Serial)
  - ISO/IEC 11518-10:2001 Part 10: 6400 Mbit/s Physical Layer (HIPPI-6400-PH)
- ISO 11532:2012 Aircraft ground equipment - Graphical symbols
- ISO/IEC 11544:1993 Information technology - Coded representation of picture and audio information - Progressive bi-level image compression
- ISO 11546 Acoustics – Determination of sound insulation performances of enclosures
  - ISO 11546-1:1995 Part 1: Measurements under laboratory conditions (for declaration purposes)
  - ISO 11546-2:1995 Part 2: Measurements in situ (for acceptance and verification purposes)
- ISO/TR 11548 Communication aids for blind persons - Identifiers, names and assignation to coded character sets for 8-dot Braille characters
  - ISO/TR 11548-1:2001 Part 1: General guidelines for Braille identifiers and shift marks
  - ISO/TR 11548-2:2001 Part 2: Latin alphabet based character sets
- ISO 11551:2003 Optics and optical instruments – Lasers and laser-related equipment – Test method for absorptance of optical laser components
- ISO 11553 Safety of machinery – Laser processing machines
  - ISO 11553-1:2005 Part 1: General safety requirements
  - ISO 11553-2:2007 Part 2: Safety requirements for hand-held laser processing devices
  - ISO 11553-3:2013 Part 3: Noise reduction and noise measurement methods for laser processing machines and hand-held processing devices and associated auxiliary equipment (accuracy grade 2)
- ISO 11554:2017 Optics and photonics – Lasers and laser-related equipment – Test methods for laser beam power, energy and temporal characteristics
- ISO/IEC 11557:1992 Information technology – 3,81 mm wide magnetic tape cartridge for information interchange – Helical scan recording – DDS-DC format using 60 m and 90 m length tapes
- ISO/IEC 11558:1992 Information technology – Data compression for information interchange – Adaptive coding with embedded dictionary – DCLZ Algorithm
- ISO/IEC 11559:1993 Information technology – Data interchange on 12,7 mm wide 18-track magnetic tape cartridges – Extended format
- ISO/IEC 11560:1992 Information technology - Information interchange on 130 mm optical disk cartridges using the magneto-optical effect, for write once, read multiple functionality
- ISO 11568 Financial services – Key management (retail) (Note: The exact wording of this title varies between parts. This is the wording of the most recently published part.)
  - ISO 11568-1:2005 Part 1: Principles
  - ISO 11568-2:2012 Part 2: Symmetric ciphers, their key management and life cycle
  - ISO 11568-4:2007 Part 4: Asymmetric cryptosystems – Key management and life cycle
- ISO/IEC 11569:1993 Information technology – Telecommunications and information exchange between systems – 26-pole interface connector mateability dimensions and contact number assignments
- ISO/IEC 11570:1992 Information technology – Telecommunications and information exchange between systems – Open Systems Interconnection – Transport protocol identification mechanism
- ISO/IEC 11571:1998 Information technology – Telecommunications and information exchange between systems – Private Integrated Services Networks – Addressing
- ISO/IEC 11572:2000 Information technology – Telecommunications and information exchange between systems – Private Integrated Services Network – Circuit mode bearer services – Inter-exchange signalling procedures and protocol
- ISO/IEC 11573:1994 Information technology – Telecommunications and information exchange between systems – Synchronization methods and technical requirements for Private Integrated Services Networks
- ISO/IEC 11574:2000 Information technology – Telecommunications and information exchange between systems – Private Integrated Services Network – Circuit-mode 64 kbit/s bearer services – Service description, functional capabilities and information flows
- ISO/IEC 11575:1995 Information technology – Telecommunications and information exchange between systems – Protocol mappings for the OSI Data Link service
- ISO/IEC 11576:1994 Information technology – Procedure for the registration of algorithms for the lossless compression of data
- ISO/IEC 11577:1995 Information technology – Open Systems Interconnection – Network layer security protocol
- ISO/IEC 11578:1996 Information technology – Open Systems Interconnection – Remote procedure call (RPC)
- ISO/IEC 11579 Information technology – Telecommunications and information exchange between systems – Private integrated services network
  - ISO/IEC 11579-1:1994 Part 1: Reference configuration for PISN Exchanges (PINX)
  - ISO/IEC 11579-2:1999 Part 2: Reference configuration for HS-PISN Exchanges (HS-PINX)
  - ISO/IEC 11579-3:1999 Part 3: Reference configuration for PINX extension lines
- ISO/IEC TR 11580:2007 Information technology – Framework for describing user interface objects, actions and attributes
- ISO/IEC 11581 Information technology – User interface icons
  - ISO/IEC 11581-1:2000 Part 1: Icons – General
  - ISO/IEC TR 11581-1:2011 Part 1: Introduction to and overview of icon standards
  - ISO/IEC 11581-2:2000 Part 2: Object icons
  - ISO/IEC 11581-3:2000 Part 3: Pointer icons
  - ISO/IEC 11581-5:2004 Part 5: Tool icons
  - ISO/IEC 11581-6:1999 Part 6: Action icons
  - ISO/IEC 11581-10:2010 Part 10: Framework and general guidance
  - ISO/IEC 11581-40:2011 Part 40: Management of icon registration
  - ISO/IEC TS 11581-41:2014 Part 41: Data structure to be used by the ISO/IEC JTC 1/SC 35 icon database
- ISO/IEC 11582:2002 Information technology – Telecommunications and information exchange between systems – Private Integrated Services Network – Generic functional protocol for the support of supplementary services – Inter-exchange signalling procedures and protocol
- ISO/TR 11583:2012 Measurement of wet gas flow by means of pressure differential devices inserted in circular cross-section conduits
- ISO/IEC 11584:1996 Information technology – Telecommunications and information exchange between systems – Private Integrated Services Network – Circuit-mode multi-rate bearer services – Service description, functional capabilities and information flows
- ISO/IEC 11586 Information technology - Open Systems Interconnection - Generic upper layers security
  - ISO/IEC 11586-1:1996 Overview, models and notation
  - ISO/IEC 11586-2:1996 Security Exchange Service Element (SESE) service definition
  - ISO/IEC 11586-3:1996 Security Exchange Service Element (SESE) protocol specification
  - ISO/IEC 11586-4:1996 Protecting transfer syntax specification
  - ISO/IEC 11586-5:1997 Security Exchange Service Element (SESE) Protocol Implementation Conformance Statement (PICS) proforma
  - ISO/IEC 11586-6:1997 Protecting transfer syntax Protocol Implementation Conformance Statement (PICS) proforma
- ISO/IEC 11587:1996 Information technology – Open Systems Interconnection – Application Context for Systems Management with Transaction Processing
- ISO 11593:1996 Manipulating industrial robots - Automatic end effector exchange systems - Vocabulary and presentation of characteristics
- ISO 11607:2006 Packaging for Terminally Sterilized Medical Devices
- ISO 11608 Needle-based injection systems for medical use – Requirements and test methods
  - ISO 11608-1:2014 Part 1: Needle-based injection systems
  - ISO 11608-2:2012 Part 2: Needles
  - ISO 11608-3:2012 Part 3: Finished containers
  - ISO 11608-4:2006 Part 4: Requirements and test methods for electronic and electromechanical pen-injectors
  - ISO 11608-5:2012 Part 5: Automated functions
  - ISO 11608-7:2016 Part 7: Accessibility for persons with visual impairment
- ISO 11609:2017 Dentistry - Dentifrices - Requirements, test methods and marking
- ISO/TR 11610:2004 Protective clothing - Vocabulary
- ISO 11612 Protective clothing - Protection against brief contact with heat and flame. The heat can be convective, radiant, molten material, or a combination thereof.
- ISO 11615:2012 Health informatics – Identification of medicinal products – Data elements and structures for the unique identification and exchange of regulated medicinal product information
- ISO 11616:2012 Health informatics – Identification of medicinal products – Data elements and structures for the unique identification and exchange of regulated pharmaceutical product information
- ISO 11620:2014 Information and documentation - Library performance indicators
- ISO 11631:1998 Measurement of fluid flow – Methods of specifying flowmeter performance
- ISO/TR 11633 Health informatics – Information security management for remote maintenance of medical devices and medical information systems
  - ISO/TR 11633-1:2009 Part 1: Requirements and risk analysis
  - ISO/TR 11633-2:2009 Part 2: Implementation of an information security management system (ISMS)
- ISO/TR 11636:2009 Health Informatics – Dynamic on-demand virtual private network for health information infrastructure
- ISO 11648 Statistical aspects of sampling from bulk materials
  - ISO 11648-1:2003 Part 1: General principles
  - ISO 11648-2:2001 Part 2: Sampling of particulate materials
- ISO 11649:2009 Financial services – Core banking – Structured creditor reference to remittance information
- ISO/TR 11651:2015 Estimation of sediment deposition in reservoirs using one dimensional simulation models
- ISO 11655:1995 Measurement of liquid flow in open channels – Method of specifying performance of hydrometric equipment
- ISO 11657:2014 Hydrometry – Suspended sediment in streams and canals – Determination of concentration by surrogate techniques
- ISO 11658:2012 Cardiovascular implants and extracorporeal systems – Blood/tissue contact surface modifications for extracorporeal perfusion systems
- ISO 11663:2014 Quality of dialysis fluid for haemodialysis and related therapies
- ISO 11664 Colorimetry
  - ISO 11664-1:2007 Part 1: CIE standard colorimetric observers
  - ISO 11664-2:2007 Part 2: CIE standard illuminants
  - ISO 11664-3:2012 Part 3: CIE tristimulus values
  - ISO 11664-4:2008 Part 4: CIE 1976 L*a*b* Colour space
  - ISO/CIE 11664-5:2016 Part 5: CIE 1976 L*u*v* colour space and u', v' uniform chromaticity scale diagram
  - ISO/CIE 11664-6:2014 Part 6: CIEDE2000 Colour-difference formula
- ISO 11665 Measurement of radioactivity in the environment - Air: radon-222
  - ISO 11665-1:2012 Part 1: Origins of radon and its short-lived decay products and associated measurement methods
  - ISO 11665-2:2012 Part 2: Integrated measurement method for determining average potential alpha energy concentration of its short-lived decay products
  - ISO 11665-3:2012 Part 3: Spot measurement method of the potential alpha energy concentration of its short-lived decay products
  - ISO 11665-4:2012 Part 4: Integrated measurement method for determining average activity concentration using passive sampling and delayed analysis
  - ISO 11665-5:2012 Part 5: Continuous measurement method of the activity concentration
  - ISO 11665-6:2012 Part 6: Spot measurement method of the activity concentration
  - ISO 11665-7:2012 Part 7: Accumulation method for estimating surface exhalation rate
  - ISO 11665-8:2012 Part 8: Methodologies for initial and additional investigations in buildings
  - ISO 11665-9:2016 Part 9: Test methods for exhalation rate of building materials
  - ISO 11665-11:2016 Part 11: Test method for soil gas with sampling at depth
- ISO/TS 11669:2012 Translation projects - General guidance
- ISO 11670:2003 Lasers and laser-related equipment – Test methods for laser beam parameters – Beam positional stability
- ISO/TS 11672:2016 Connectors for fluid power and general use - Designation and nomenclature
- ISO 11675:2005 Textile machinery and accessories – Flatbed knitting machines – Vocabulary
- ISO 11676:2014 Textile machinery and accessories – Pattern disks and pattern chains for warp knitting machines – Vocabulary and symbols
- ISO 11683:1997 Packaging - Tactile warnings of danger - Requirements
- ISO 11684:1995 Tractors, machinery for agriculture and forestry, powered lawn and garden equipment - Safety signs and hazard pictorials - General principles
- ISO/TR 11688 Acoustics – Recommended practice for the design of low-noise machinery and equipment
  - ISO/TR 11688-1:1995 Part 1: Planning
  - ISO/TR 11688-2:1998 Part 2: Introduction to the physics of low-noise design
- ISO 11689:1996 Acoustics – Procedure for the comparison of noise-emission data for machinery and equipment
- ISO/IEC 11693 Identification cards – Optical memory cards
  - ISO/IEC 11693-1:2012 Part 1: General characteristics
  - ISO/IEC 11693-2:2009 Part 2: Co-existence of optical memory with other machine readable technologies
  - ISO/IEC 11693-3:2015 Part 3: Authentication techniques
- ISO/IEC 11694 Identification cards – Optical memory cards – Linear recording method
  - ISO/IEC 11694-1:2012 Part 1: Physical characteristics
  - ISO/IEC 11694-2:2012 Part 2: Dimensions and location of the accessible optical area
  - ISO/IEC 11694-3:2015 Part 3: Optical properties and characteristics
  - ISO/IEC 11694-4:2008 Part 4: Logical data structures
  - ISO/IEC 11694-5:2014 Part 5: Data format for information interchange for applications using ISO/IEC 11694-4
  - ISO/IEC 11694-6:2014 Part 6: Use of biometrics on an optical memory card
- ISO/IEC 11695 Identification cards – Optical memory cards – Holographic recording method
  - ISO/IEC 11695-1:2015 Part 1: Physical characteristics
  - ISO/IEC 11695-2:2015 Part 2: Dimensions and location of accessible optical area
  - ISO/IEC 11695-3:2017 Part 3: Optical properties and characteristics
- ISO 11704:2010 Water quality - Measurement of gross alpha and beta activity concentration in non-saline water - Liquid scintillation counting method
- ISO 11712:2009 Anaesthetic and respiratory equipment – Supralaryngeal airways and connectors
- ISO 11731:2017 Water quality - Enumeration of Legionella
- ISO 11737 Sterilization of medical devices – Microbiological methods
  - ISO 11737-1:2006 Part 1: Determination of a population of microorganisms on products
  - ISO 11737-2:2009 Part 2: Tests of sterility performed in the definition, validation and maintenance of a sterilization process
- ISO/IEC 11756:1999 Information technology - Programming languages - M
- ISO/TR 11766:2010 Intelligent transport systems – Communications access for land mobiles (CALM) – Security considerations for lawful interception
- ISO/TR 11769:2010 Intelligent transport systems – Communications access for land mobiles (CALM) – Data retention for law enforcement
- ISO/IEC 11770 Information technology - Security techniques - Key management
  - ISO/IEC 11770-1:2010 Part 1: Framework
  - ISO/IEC 11770-2:2008 Part 2: Mechanisms using symmetric techniques
  - ISO/IEC 11770-3:2015 Part 3: Mechanisms using asymmetric techniques
  - ISO/IEC 11770-4:2006 Part 4: Mechanisms based on weak secrets
  - ISO/IEC 11770-5:2011 Part 5: Group key management
  - ISO/IEC 11770-6:2016 Part 6: Key derivation
- ISO/TS 11774:2011 Non-destructive testing – Performance-based qualification
- ISO 11783 Tractors and machinery for agriculture and forestry – Serial control and communications data network
- ISO 11798:1999 Information and documentation - Permanence and durability of writing, printing and copying on paper - Requirements and test methods
- ISO 11799:2015 Information and documentation - Document storage requirements for archive and library materials
- ISO 11800:1998 Information and documentation – Requirements for binding materials and methods used in the manufacture of books
- ISO/IEC 11801:2002 Information technology – Generic cabling for customer premises
  - ISO/IEC TR 11801-9901:2014 Part 9901: Guidance for balanced cabling in support of at least 40 Gbit/s data transmission
  - ISO/IEC TR 11801-9902:2017 Part 9902: Specifications for End-to-end link configurations
  - ISO/IEC TR 11801-9903:2015 Part 9903: Matrix modelling of channels and links
  - ISO/IEC TR 11801-9904:2017 Part 9904: Guidelines for the use of installed cabling to support 2,5GBASE -T and 5GBASE -T applications
- ISO/IEC TR 11802 Information technology – Telecommunications and information exchange between systems – Local and metropolitan area networks – Technical reports and guidelines
  - ISO/IEC TR 11802-5:1997 Part 5: Media Access Control (MAC) Bridging of Ethernet V2.0 in Local Area Networks
- ISO 11807 Integrated optics - Vocabulary
  - ISO 11807-1:2001 Part 1: Basic terms and symbols
  - ISO 11807-2:2001 Part 2: Terms used in classification
- ISO 11810:2015 Lasers and laser-related equipment – Test method and classification for the laser resistance of surgical drapes and/or patient protective covers – Primary ignition, penetration, flame spread and secondary ignition
- ISO/TR 11811:2012 Nanotechnologies – Guidance on methods for nano- and microtribology measurements
- ISO 11819 Acoustics – Measurement of the influence of road surfaces on traffic noise
  - ISO 11819-1:1997 Part 1: Statistical Pass-By method
  - ISO 11819-2:2017 Part 2: The close-proximity method
  - ISO/TS 11819-3:2017 Part 3: Reference tyres
  - ISO/PAS 11819-4:2013 Part 4: SPB method using backing board
- ISO 11821:1997 Acoustics – Measurement of the in situ sound attenuation of a removable screen
- ISO 11822:1996 Information and documentation - Extension of the Arabic alphabet coded character set for bibliographic information interchange
- ISO 11838:1997 Motorcycle and motorcycle-rider kinematics – Vocabulary
- ISO 11841 Road vehicles and internal combustion engines – Filter vocabulary
  - ISO 11841-1:2000 Part 1: Definitions of filters and filter components
  - ISO 11841-2:2000 Part 2: Definitions of characteristics of filters and their components
- ISO 11843 Capability of detection
  - ISO 11843-1:1997 Part 1: Terms and definitions
  - ISO 11843-2:2000 Part 2: Methodology in the linear calibration case
  - ISO 11843-3:2003 Part 3: Methodology for determination of the critical value for the response variable when no calibration data are used
  - ISO 11843-4:2003 Part 4: Methodology for comparing the minimum detectable value with a given value
  - ISO 11843-5:2008 Part 5: Methodology in the linear and non-linear calibration cases
  - ISO 11843-6:2013 Part 6: Methodology for the determination of the critical value and the minimum detectable value in Poisson distributed measurements by normal approximations
  - ISO 11843-7:2012 Part 7: Methodology based on stochastic properties of instrumental noise
- ISO 11866 Milk and milk products – Enumeration of presumptive Escherichia coli
  - ISO 11866-1:2005 Part 1: Most probable number technique using 4-methylumbelliferyl-beta-D-glucuronide (MUG)
  - ISO 11866-2:2005 Part 2: Colony-count technique at 44 degrees C using membranes
- ISO 11886:2002 Building construction machinery and equipment – Pile driving and extracting equipment – Terminology and commercial specifications
- ISO/TS 11888:2017 Nanotechnologies – Characterization of multiwall carbon nanotubes – Mesoscopic shape factors
- ISO/IEC 11889 Information technology - Trusted platform module library
  - ISO/IEC 11889-1:2015 Part 1: Architecture
  - ISO/IEC 11889-2:2015 Part 2: Structures
  - ISO/IEC 11889-3:2015 Part 3: Commands
  - ISO/IEC 11889-4:2015 Part 4: Supporting Routines
- ISO 11898 Road vehicles – Controller area network (CAN)
- ISO 11904 Acoustics – Determination of sound immission from sound sources placed close to the ear
  - ISO 11904-1:2002 Part 1: Technique using a microphone in a real ear (MIRE technique)
  - ISO 11904-2:2004 Part 2: Technique using a manikin
- ISO 11929:2010 Determination of the characteristic limits (decision threshold, detection limit and limits of the confidence interval) for measurements of ionizing radiation - Fundamentals and application
- ISO 11930:2012 Cosmetics – Microbiology – Evaluation of the antimicrobial protection of a cosmetic product
- ISO/TS 11931:2012 Nanotechnologies – Nanoscale calcium carbonate in powder form – Characteristics and measurement
- ISO/TS 11937:2012 Nanotechnologies – Nanoscale titanium dioxide in powder form – Characteristics and measurement
- ISO 11940:1998 Information and documentation - Transliteration of Thai
  - ISO 11940-2:2007 Information and documentation - Transliteration of Thai characters into Latin characters - Part 2: Simplified transcription of Thai language
- ISO/TR 11941:1996 Information and documentation - Transliteration of Korean script into Latin characters [Withdrawn, no replacement]
- ISO 11957:1996 Acoustics – Determination of sound insulation performance of cabins – Laboratory and in situ measurements
- ISO/IEC 11976:2008 Information technology - Data interchange on 130 mm rewritable and write-once-read-many ultra density optical (UDO) disk cartridges - Capacity: 60 Gbytes per cartridge - Second generation
- ISO 11978:2017 Ophthalmic optics – Contact lenses and contact lens care products – Labelling
- ISO 11979 Ophthalmic implants - Intraocular lenses
  - ISO 11979-1:2012 Part 1: Vocabulary
  - ISO 11979-2:2014 Part 2: Optical properties and test methods
  - ISO 11979-3:2012 Part 3: Mechanical properties and test methods
  - ISO 11979-4:2008 Part 4: Labelling and information
  - ISO 11979-5:2006 Part 5: Biocompatibility
  - ISO 11979-6:2014 Part 6: Shelf-life and transport stability testing
  - ISO 11979-7:2014 Part 7: Clinical investigations
  - ISO 11979-8:2017 Part 8: Fundamental requirements
  - ISO 11979-9:2006 Part 9: Multifocal intraocular lenses
  - ISO 11979-10:2006 Part 10: Phakic intraocular lenses
- ISO 11980:2012 Ophthalmic optics – Contact lenses and contact lens care products – Guidance for clinical investigations
- ISO 11981:2009 Ophthalmic optics – Contact lenses and contact lens care products – Determination of physical compatibility of contact lens care products with contact lenses
- ISO 11986:2010 Ophthalmic optics – Contact lenses and contact lens care products – Determination of preservative uptake and release
- ISO 11987:2012 Ophthalmic optics – Contact lenses – Determination of shelf-life
- ISO/IEC 11989:2010 Information technology - iSCSI Management API
- ISO 11990 Lasers and laser-related equipment – Determination of laser resistance of tracheal tubes
  - ISO 11990-1:2011 Part 1: Tracheal tube shaft
  - ISO 11990-2:2010 Part 2: Tracheal tube cuffs
- ISO/TR 11991:1995 Guidance on airway management during laser surgery of upper airway
- ISO 11994:1997 Cranes – Availability – Vocabulary
