= ISO/IEC JTC 1/SC 6 =

ISO/IEC JTC 1/SC 6 Telecommunications and information exchange between systems is a standardization subcommittee of the Joint Technical Committee ISO/IEC JTC 1. It is part of the International Organization for Standardization (ISO) and the International Electrotechnical Commission (IEC), which develops and facilitates standards within the field of telecommunications and information exchange between systems.

ISO/IEC JTC 1/SC 6 was established in 1964, following the creation of a Special Working Group under ISO/TC 97 on Data Link Control Procedures and Modem Interfaces. The international secretariat of ISO/IEC JTC 1/SC 6 is the Korean Agency for Technology and Standards (KATS), located in South Korea.

== Scope ==
The scope of ISO/IEC JTC 1/SC 6 is “Standardization in the field of telecommunications dealing with the exchange of information between open systems including system functions, procedures, parameters as well as the conditions for their use. The standardization encompasses protocols and services of lower layers, including physical, data link, network, and transport as well as those of upper layers including but not limited to Directory and ASN.1.”

Future Network has recently been added as an important work scope. A considerable part of the work is done in effective cooperation with ITU-T and other standardization bodies including IEEE 802 and Ecma International.

== Structure ==
ISO/IEC JTC 1/SC 6 has three active working groups (WGs), each of which carries out specific tasks in standards development within the field of telecommunications and information exchange between systems. The focus of each working group is described in the group’s terms of reference. Working groups can be established if new working areas arise, or disbanded if the group’s working area is no longer relevant to standardization needs. Active working groups of ISO/IEC JTC 1/SC 6 are:

Working Group	Working Area
ISO/IEC JTC 1/SC 6/WG 1	Physical and Data Link Layers
ISO/IEC JTC 1/SC 6/WG 7	Network, Transport and Future Network
ISO/IEC JTC 1/SC 6/WG 10	Directory, ASN.1 and Registration

== Collaborations ==
ISO/IEC JTC 1/SC 6 works in close collaboration with a number of other organizations or subcommittees, both internal and external to ISO or IEC. Organizations internal to ISO or IEC that collaborate with or are in liaison with ISO/IEC JTC 1/SC 6 include:

- ISO/IEC JTC 1/WG 7, Sensor networks
- ISO/IEC JTC 1/SC 17, Cards and personal identification
- ISO/IEC JTC 1/SC 25, Interconnection of information technology equipment
- ISO/IEC JTC 1/SC 27, IT security techniques
- ISO/IEC JTC 1/SC 29, Coding of audio, picture, multimedia and hypermedia information
- ISO/IEC JTC 1/SC 31, Automatic identification and data capture techniques
- ISO/IEC JTC 1/SC 38, Distributed application platforms & services (DAPS)
- ISO/TC 68, Financial services
- ISO/TC 122, Packaging
- ISO/TC 184/SC 5, Interoperability, integration, and architectures for enterprise systems and automation applications
- ISO/TC 215, Health Informatics
- IEC/SC 46A, Coaxial cables
- IEC/SC 46C, Wires and symmetric cables
- IEC/TC 48, Electrical connectors and mechanical structures for electrical and electronic equipment
- IEC/SC 48B, Electrical connectors
- IEC/TC 65, Industrial-process measurement, control and automation
- IEC/SC 65C, Industrial networks
- IEC/TC 86, Fibre optics
- IEC/SC 86C, Fibre optic systems and active devices
- IEC/TC 93, Design automation

Some organizations external to ISO or IEC that collaborate with or are in liaison to ISO/IEC JTC 1/SC 6 include:

- European Conference of Postal and Telecommunications Administrations (CEPT)
- European Organization for Nuclear Research (CERN)
- European Commission (EC)
- European Telecommunications Standards Institute (ETSI)
- Ecma International
- International Civil Aviation Organization (ICAO)
- IEEE 802 LMSC (LAN/MAN Standards Committee)
- Internet Society (ISOC)
- International Telecommunications Satellite Organization (ITSO)
- ITU-T
- Organization for the Advancement of Structured Information Standards (OASIS)
- NFC Forum
- MFA Forum
- United Nations Conference on Trade and Development (UNCTAD)
- United Nations Economic Commission for Europe (UNECE)
- Universal Postal Union (UPU)
- World Meteorological Organization (WMO)
- CEN/TC 247/WG 4

== Member countries ==
Countries pay a fee to ISO to be members of subcommittees.

The 19 "P" (participating) members of ISO/IEC JTC 1/SC 6 are: Austria, Belgium, Canada, China, Czech Republic, Finland, Germany, Greece, Jamaica, Japan, Kazakhstan, Republic of Korea, Netherlands, Russian Federation, Spain, Switzerland, Tunisia, United Kingdom, and United States.

The 31 "O" (observing) members of ISO/IEC JTC 1/SC 6 are: Argentina, Bosnia and Herzegovina, Colombia, Cuba, Cyprus, France, Ghana, Hong Kong, Hungary, Iceland, India, Indonesia, Islamic Republic of Iran, Ireland, Italy, Kenya, Luxembourg, Malaysia, Malta, New Zealand, Norway, Philippines, Poland, Romania, Saudi Arabia, Serbia, Singapore, Slovenia, Thailand, Turkey, and Ukraine.

== Published standards ==
There are 365 published standards under the direct responsibility of ISO/IEC JTC 1/SC 6. Published standards by ISO/IEC JTC 1/SC 6 include:

ISO/IEC Standard	Title	Status	Description	WG
ISO/IEC 8072 free	Information technology – Open systems interconnection (OSI) – Transport service definition	Published (1996)	Defines the externally visible service provided by the OSI Transport layer in terms of: The primitive actions and events of the service; The parameter data associated with each primitive action and event; The relationship between, and the valid sequences of, these events and actions	7
ISO/IEC 8348	Information technology – Open Systems Interconnection (OSI) – Network service definition	Published (2002)	Defines the OSI network service in terms of: The primitive actions and events of the Service; The actions associated with each primitive action and event, and the form that they take; The interrelationship between these actions and events	7
ISO/IEC 8473-1 free	Information technology – Protocol for providing the connectionless-mode network service: Protocol specification	Published (1998)	Specifies: Procedures for the connectionless transmission of data and control information from one Network entity to one or more other Network entities; The encoding of Protocol Data Units (PDUs) used for the transmission of data and control information; Procedures for the correct interpretation of protocol control information	7
ISO/IEC/IEEE 8802-3:2017	Information technology – Telecommunications and information exchange between systems – Local and metropolitan area networks – Specific requirements – Part 3: Standard for Ethernet	Published (2017)	Describes the media access control characteristics for the Carrier-sense multiple access with collision detection (CSMA/CD) access method for shared medium local area networks	1
ISO/IEC/IEEE 8802-11	Information technology – Telecommunications and information exchange between systems – Local and metropolitan area networks – Specific requirements – Part 11: Wireless LAN medium access control (MAC) and physical layer (PHY) specifications	Published (2012)	Defines one MAC and several PHY specifications for wireless connectivity for fixed, portable, and moving stations within a local area	1
ISO/IEC 8824-1 free	Information technology – Abstract Syntax Notation One (ASN.1): Specification of basic notation	Published (2015)	Specifies a standard notation, ASN.1, that is used for the definition of data types, values, and constraints on data types. First part of the ISO/IEC 8824 series, which contains 4 parts.	10
ISO/IEC 8825-1 free	Information technology – ASN.1 encoding rules: Specification of Basic Encoding Rules (BER), Canonical Encoding Rules (CER) and Distinguished Encoding Rules (DER)	Published (2015)	Specifies a set of basic encoding rules that can be used to derive the specification of a transfer syntax for values of types defined using the Abstract Syntax Notation One. First part of the ISO/IEC 8825 series, which contains 6 parts including packed encoding rules (PER), XML encoding rules (XER) and encoding control notation (ECN).	10
ISO/IEC 9594-1	Information technology – Open Systems Interconnection – The Directory: Overview of concepts, models and services	Published (2017)	Provides an overview of the concepts, models, and services related to “The Directory,” which provides the directory capabilities required by OSI applications. First part of the ISO/IEC 9594 series, which contains 8 parts.	10
ISO/IEC 9834-1 free	Information technology – Procedures for the operation of object identifier registration authorities: General procedures and top arcs of the international object identifier tree	Published (2012)	Specifies a tree structure for allocations made by a hierarchical structure of Registration Authorities, called the international object identifier (OID) tree, which supports the ASN.1 OBJECT IDENTIFIER type and the ASN.1 OID-IRI type (ISO/IEC 8824-1). First part of the ISO/IEC 9834 series, which contains 9 parts.	10
ISO/IEC 10021-1	Information technology – Message Handling Systems (MHS) – Part 1: System and service overview	Published (2003)	Defines the overall system and service of an MHS and serves as a general overview of an MHS	
ISO/IEC 21481 free	Information technology – Telecommunications and information exchange between systems – Near Field Communication Interface and Protocol -2 (NFCIP-2)	Published (2012)	Specifies the communication mode selection mechanism designed not to disturb any ongoing communication at 13,56 MHz	1
ISO/IEC 24824-1 free	Information technology – Generic applications of ASN.1: Fast infoset	Published (2007)	Specifies a representation of an instance of the W3C XML Information Set using binary encodings. These binary encodings are specified using the ASN.1 notation and the ASN.1 Encoding Control Notation (ECN). First part of the ISO/IEC 24824 series, which contains 3 parts.	10
ISO/IEC 29168-1	Information technology – Open systems interconnection – Part 1: Object identifier resolution system	Published (2011)	Specifies the object identifier (OID) resolution system (ORS), including the overall architecture and a DNS-based resolution mechanism. First part of the ISO/IEC 29168 series, which contains 2 parts.	10

== See also ==
- ISO/IEC JTC 1
- List of ISO standards
- Korean Agency for Technology and Standards
- International Organization for Standardization
- International Electrotechnical Commission
