= Bracket (architecture) =

Architectural element

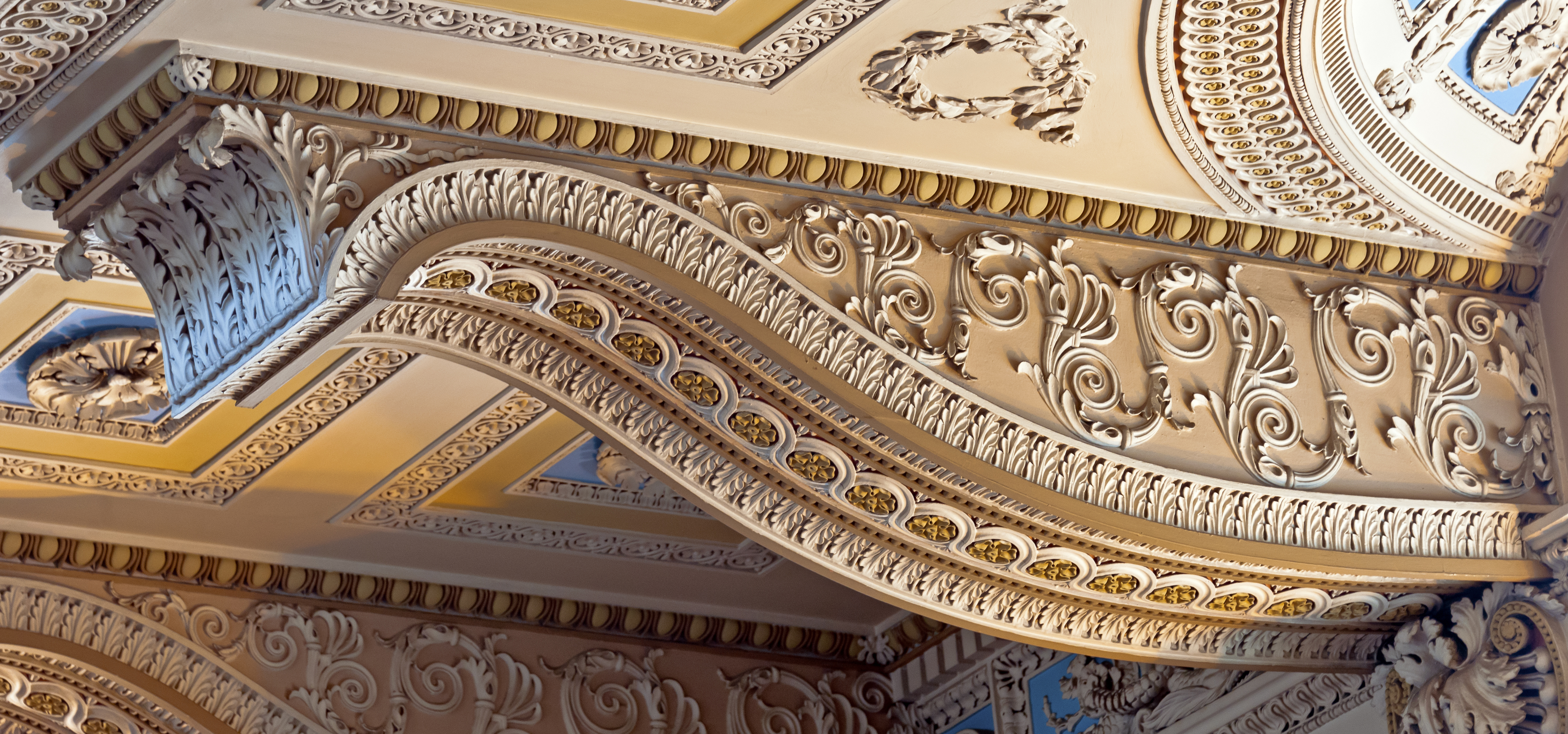
A classically detailed bracket at the chapel of Greenwich Hospital, London

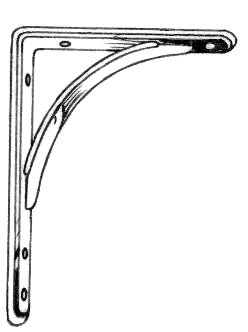
Bracket for a shelf or hanging items

A bracket is a structural or decorative architectural element that projects from a wall, usually to carry weight and sometimes to "strengthen an angle". It can be made of wood, stone, plaster, metal, or other media. A corbel or console are types of brackets.

In mechanical engineering a bracket is any intermediate component for fixing one part to another, usually larger, part. What makes a bracket a bracket is that it is intermediate between the two and fixes the one to the other. Brackets vary widely in shape, but a prototypical bracket is the L-shaped metal piece that attaches a shelf (the smaller component) to a wall (the larger component): its vertical arm is fixed to one (usually large) element, and its horizontal arm protrudes outwards and holds another (usually small) element. This shelf bracket is effectively the same as the architectural bracket: a vertical arm mounted on the wall, and a horizontal arm projecting outwards for another element to be attached on top of it or below it. To enable the outstretched arm to support a greater weight, a bracket will often have a third arm running diagonally between the horizontal and vertical arms, or the bracket may be a solid triangle. By extension almost any object that performs this function of attaching one part to another (usually larger) component is also called a bracket, even though it may not be obviously L-shaped. Common examples that are often not really L-shaped at all but attach a smaller component to a larger and are still called brackets are the components that attach a bicycle lamp to a bicycle, and the rings that attach pipes to walls.

== Uses ==
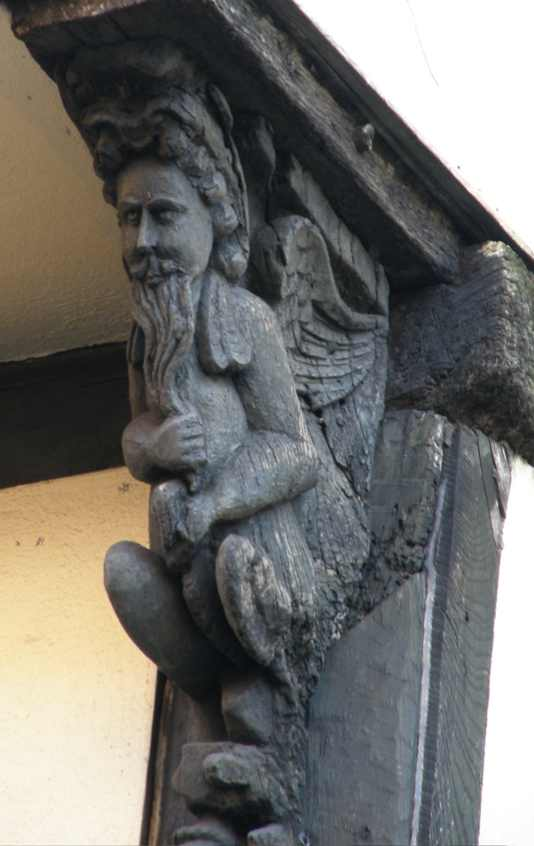
Brackets are used in traditional timber framing, including the support of a jettied floor which can be carved. Magdalene Street, Cambridge, England. Sixteenth century

Brackets can support many architectural items, including a wall, balcony, parapets, eaves, the spring of an arch, beams, pergola roof, window box, or a shelf. The term is also used to describe a shelf designed to hold a statue.

In adjustable shelving systems, the bracket may be in two parts, with the load-bearing horizontal support fitting into a wall-mounted slotted vertical metal strip.

Brackets also are an element in the systems used to mount modern facade cladding systems onto the outside of contemporary buildings, as well as interior panels.

=== Architectural sculptures ===
Brackets are often in the form of architectural sculptures with reliefs of objects and scrolls. Depending on their material, decorated ones can be carved, cast, or molded. They can be of cast stone or resin-foam materials with faux finishes for use on new buildings in historic revival styles of architecture.

Some brackets and corbels are only ornamental, and serve no actual supporting purpose.

== Types ==
Types of Brackets

1. Support brackets: These brackets offer extra support to architectural elements like balconies and canopies. They ensure the weight is properly transferred to the main structure, preventing collapse and other damage.
2. Corbel: This bracket sticks out from the wall, providing added support to beams, arches, and other architectural features. Corbels are often carved and decorated to enhance their visual appeal, and they can be made from various materials like wood, metal, or stone.
3. Console brackets: Similar to corbels but more decorative, console brackets are often used indoors for items like shelves and mantels. They add both support and aesthetic flair to horizontal architectural elements.
4. Ancone brackets: a bracket or console that supports a cornice.
5. Modillion brackets: a horizontally shaped bracket that is less imposing than a corbel bracket.

There are various other bracket types, including lintel brackets, dentil brackets, gable brackets, balcony brackets, beam brackets, and rafter brackets.

== Specialized brackets ==
Specialized brackets support the coverboards that shield third rails or support the guide bars of rubber-tyred metros.

== See also ==
- Dougong, wooden brackets commonly found in East Asian architecture
- Structural support
