= ArmSCII =

Set of obsolete single-byte character encodings

ArmSCII

ArmSCII or ARMSCII is a set of obsolete single-byte character encodings for the Armenian alphabet defined by Armenian national standard 166–9. ArmSCII is an acronym for Armenian Standard Code for Information Interchange, similar to ASCII for the American standard. It has been superseded by the Unicode standard.

However, these encodings are not widely used because the standard was published one year after the publication of international standard ISO 10585 that defined another 7-bit encoding, from which the encoding and mapping to the UCS (Universal Coded Character Set (ISO/IEC 10646) and Unicode standards) were also derived a few years after, and there was a lack of support in the computer industry for adding ArmSCII.

== Encodings defined in the ArmSCII standard ==
Very few systems support these encodings. Microsoft Windows does not support them, for example. It is usually better to use Unicode for proper interchange of Armenian text for web browsers and email, since most modern computers do not support ArmSCII by default.

The following three main variants are defined:

- ArmSCII-7 defined in AST 34.005 is a 7-bit encoding, not containing Latin characters.
- ArmSCII-8 defined in AST 34.002 is an 8-bit encoding and a superset of ASCII.
- ArmSCII-8A defined in AST 34.002 is an alternate 8-bit encoding and also a superset of ASCII.

Note that each ArmSCII encoding also has several minor variants, depending on the revision of the related Armenian standard (which was not made official before 1997, and was defined informally before that; this has caused various confusions and the mappings described below are just best practices according to the latest 1997 revision of the Armenian standard); that may change the exact mapping and usage of a few punctuation characters and symbols.

None of the ArmSCII encodings have reached international approval (unlike the ISO 10585 standard, despite the critiques sent by the official Armenian standard body to ISO/DIS JTC 1/SC 2/WG 2, working on single byte-coded character sets) because all international efforts have been made since then to work with the UCS (in Unicode and ISO 10646).

ArmSCII-8 is intended for use on Unix and Windows systems, and for information interchange on the WWW and by email. However, Microsoft wanted users to use Unicode and not introduce a plethora of new code pages, so it is not supported natively on Windows. It just consists in remapping ArmSCII-7 in the higher range above the standard US ASCII range.

ArmSCII-8A is intended for use on DOS and Mac systems. It is a rearrangement of ArmSCII-8, to work with existing DOS and Mac code that reserve a range of code values for characters not intended for text but for presentation layout, using modified fonts; it is, however, considered as a "hack" of the code pages over which it is applied, as neither DOS (nor Windows in the "OEM" compatibility codepages used by the text-only console) nor MacOS has ever supported this encoding natively, notably in their file system (but this is also true for the now deprecated ISO 10585 standard). However, this encoding cannot map all the punctuation characters normally needed for Armenian, so the missing characters must be approximated using fallbacks to ASCII punctuation (some Armenian fonts may display these ASCII punctuation using the rendering intended for the Armenian characters that are mapped to them by these fallbacks).

=== ArmSCII-7 ===
AST 34.005:1997 (ArmSCII-7) 7-bit coded character set for Armenian
	x0	x1	x2	x3	x4	x5	x6	x7	x8	x9	xA	xB	xC	xD	xE	xF
0x	unused															
1x	unused															
2x	SP	֎	և / §	։	)	(	»	«	—	․	՝	,	‐	֊	…	՜
3x	՛	՞	Ա	ա	Բ	բ	Գ	գ	Դ	դ	Ե	ե	Զ	զ	Է	է
4x	Ը	ը	Թ	թ	Ժ	ժ	Ի	ի	Լ	լ	Խ	խ	Ծ	ծ	Կ	կ
5x	Հ	հ	Ձ	ձ	Ղ	ղ	Ճ	ճ	Մ	մ	Յ	յ	Ն	ն	Շ	շ
6x	Ո	ո	Չ	չ	Պ	պ	Ջ	ջ	Ռ	ռ	Ս	ս	Վ	վ	Տ	տ
7x	Ր	ր	Ց	ց	Ւ	ւ	Փ	փ	Ք	ք	Օ	օ	Ֆ	ֆ	՚	

In this table, code value 21 is the eternity sign, which has, since 2013, a designated point in Unicode U+058E (LEFT-FACING ARMENIAN ETERNITY SIGN) and another for its right-facing variant: U+058D (RIGHT-FACING ARMENIAN ETERNITY SIGN). Some mappings incorrectly claim that it has a code point of U+0530.

Code value 20 is the regular SPACE character; code values 00–1F and 7F are not assigned to characters by AST 34.005, though they may be the same as the ASCII control characters that are located in those positions.

Code value 22 is used to encode the Armenian ligature ew (և). In some variants, it encodes the section sign (§) instead. It is strongly suggested to encode this ligature with the normal Armenian ech (yech) and yiwn (vyun) small letters pair, as various software or fonts will render it differently depending on the version of ArmSCII-7 they are assuming, and so let the renderer generate the ligature.

Code value 7F may be used sometimes as a substitution for the non-breaking space.

Note that the characters encoded at code values 2D and 7E (Armenian hyphen and apostrophe) may not be visible with all fonts supporting Armenian.

This table is simply remapped to higher codes by simple offset in ArmSCII-8 (below).

=== ArmSCII-8 ===
AST 34.002:1997 (ArmSCII-8) 8-bit coded character set for Armenian
	x0	x1	x2	x3	x4	x5	x6	x7	x8	x9	xA	xB	xC	xD	xE	xF
0x	unused															
1x	unused															
2x	SP	!	"	#	$	%	&	'	(	)	*	+	,	-	.	/
3x	0	1	2	3	4	5	6	7	8	9	:	;	<	=	>	?
4x	@	A	B	C	D	E	F	G	H	I	J	K	L	M	N	O
5x	P	Q	R	S	T	U	V	W	X	Y	Z	[	\	]		_
6x	`	a	b	c	d	e	f	g	h	i	j	k	l	m	n	o
7x	p	q	r	s	t	u	v	w	x	y	z	{	|	}	~	
8x	unused															
9x	unused															
Ax	NB; SP	֎	և / §	։	)	(	»	«	—	․	՝	,	‐	֊	…	՜
Bx	՛	՞	Ա	ա	Բ	բ	Գ	գ	Դ	դ	Ե	ե	Զ	զ	Է	է
Cx	Ը	ը	Թ	թ	Ժ	ժ	Ի	ի	Լ	լ	Խ	խ	Ծ	ծ	Կ	կ
Dx	Հ	հ	Ձ	ձ	Ղ	ղ	Ճ	ճ	Մ	մ	Յ	յ	Ն	ն	Շ	շ
Ex	Ո	ո	Չ	չ	Պ	պ	Ջ	ջ	Ռ	ռ	Ս	ս	Վ	վ	Տ	տ
Fx	Ր	ր	Ց	ց	Ւ	ւ	Փ	փ	Ք	ք	Օ	օ	Ֆ	ֆ	՚	

In this table, code value 20 is reserved for the regular SPACE character, code value A0 is reserved for the non-breaking space, and code value A1 is assigned to the eternity sign, which has, since 2013, a designated point in Unicode U+58E (LEFT-FACING ARMENIAN ETERNITY SIGN) and another for its right-facing variant: U+58D (RIGHT-FACING ARMENIAN ETERNITY SIGN). Some mappings incorrectly claim that it has a code point of U+0530.

Code values 00–1F and 7F–9F are not assigned to characters by AST 34.002, though they may be the same as the ISO-8859-1 control characters that are located in those positions.

The code value A2 is used to encode the Armenian ligature ew (և). In some variants it encodes the section sign (§) instead. Some Armenian fonts display this ligature at the position of the ASCII ampersand symbol, but it is strongly suggested to encode the ligature using the two standard Armenian small letters that compose it.

The code value FF may be filled with the Armenian small letter modifier apostrophe (but it has no mapping in Unicode, and shown here using the ASCII apostrophe instead, for correct rendering with Unicode fonts, it is suggested that the small letter modifier be represented using code value FE with ligature control to change its position because it only occurs after a small Armenian letter), and the Armenian apostrophe encoded at FE occurs only after a capital Armenian letter. So most implementations do not encode anything at code value FF.

This standard is the only one that makes an apparent distinction for the "mirrored" Armenian parentheses, because it was created by simply remapping the ArmSCII-7 standard. However, many documents will not consider this as a productive distinction, and the usual ASCII-based parenthesis punctuation are most commonly used instead of the ArmSCII-7-based mirrored parentheses, just because Armenian keyboards and editors using ArmSCII-8 generated the lower ASCII codes (whose usage is just swapped in classical Armenian). Also, the duplication of the ASCII comma at code value AB is also the result of the simple remapping of ArmSCII-7, so there is no difference with the ASCII comma that most ArmSCII-8 documents are using.

Note that the characters encoded at code values AD and FE (Armenian hyphen and apostrophe) may not be visible with all fonts supporting Armenian. FreeDOS calls this Code Page 65506.

=== ArmSCII-8A ===
AST 34.001:1997 (ArmSCII-8A) 8-bit coded character set for Armenian
	x0	x1	x2	x3	x4	x5	x6	x7	x8	x9	xA	xB	xC	xD	xE	xF
0x	unused															
1x	unused															
2x	SP	!	"	#	$	%	&	'	(	)	*	+	,	-	.	/
3x	0	1	2	3	4	5	6	7	8	9	:	;	<	=	>	?
4x	@	A	B	C	D	E	F	G	H	I	J	K	L	M	N	O
5x	P	Q	R	S	T	U	V	W	X	Y	Z	[	\	]		_
6x	`	a	b	c	d	e	f	g	h	i	j	k	l	m	n	o
7x	p	q	r	s	t	u	v	w	x	y	z	{	|	}	~	
8x	Ա	ա	Բ	բ	Գ	գ	Դ	դ	Ե	ե	Զ	զ	Է	է	Ը	ը
9x	Թ	թ	Ժ	ժ	Ի	ի	Լ	լ	Խ	խ	Ծ	ծ	Կ	կ	Հ	հ
Ax	Ձ	ձ	Ղ	ղ	Ճ	ճ	Մ	մ	Յ	յ	Ն	ն	Շ	շ	«	»
Bx	unused															
Cx	unused															
Dx													֎	֊	…	՞
Ex	Ո	ո	Չ	չ	Պ	պ	Ջ	ջ	Ռ	ռ	Ս	ս	Վ	վ	Տ	տ
Fx	Ր	ր	Ց	ց	Ւ	ւ	Փ	փ	Ք	ք	Օ	օ	Ֆ	ֆ	՚	NB; SP

In this table, code value 20 is the regular SPACE character, and code value DC is the eternity sign, which has, since 2013, a designated point in Unicode U+58E (LEFT-FACING ARMENIAN ETERNITY SIGN) and another for its right-facing variant: U+58D (RIGHT-FACING ARMENIAN ETERNITY SIGN). Some mappings incorrectly claim that it has a code point of U+0530.

Code values 00–1F, 7F, and B0–DB are not assigned to characters by AST 34.002, though they may be the same as those used in a legacy DOS/OEM codepage 437 (box drawing characters) or Macintosh Roman.

Note that the characters encoded at code values DD and FE (Armenian hyphen and apostrophe) may not be visible with all fonts supporting Armenian. FreeDOS calls this Code Page 899 (probably an error, as IBM uses this code page number for a different encoding.

== Support for the Armenian script in other standards ==
=== ISO 10585:1996 ===
ISO 10585:1996 7-bit coded character set for Armenian
	x0	x1	x2	x3	x4	x5	x6	x7	x8	x9	xA	xB	xC	xD	xE	xF
0x	unused															
1x	unused															
2x	SP	Ա	Բ	Գ	Դ	Ե	Զ	Է	Ը	Թ	Ժ	Ի	Լ	Խ	Ծ	Կ
3x	Հ	Ձ	Ղ	Ճ	Մ	Յ	Ն	Շ	Ո	Չ	Պ	Ջ	Ռ	Ս	Վ	Տ
4x	Ր	Ց	Ւ	Փ	Ք	Օ	Ֆ		՝	՚	֊		։	,	՞	՟
5x		ա	բ	գ	դ	ե	զ	է	ը	թ	ժ	ի	լ	խ	ծ	կ
6x	հ	ձ	ղ	ճ	մ	յ	ն	շ	ո	չ	պ	ջ	ռ	ս	վ	տ
7x	ր	ց	ւ	փ	ք	օ	ֆ		―	‐	″		․	՛	՜	

For comparison, this is the 7-bit encoding in the international standard ISO/IEC 10585 standard that was used before the revision in the Armenian standard AST34.002:1997 (ArmSCII-8).

In this standard (as well as in ISO/IEC 10646 and Unicode), there's only one Armenian apostrophe modifier letter encoded at 0x49 when Armenian uses two modifier letter apostrophes which are cased (U+055A represents the capital apostrophe but is not considered dual-cased in Unicode and this ISO 15985 standard, the small letter apostrophe is absent but generally represented by the ASCII apostrophe U+0027 in Unicode documents).

The left half-ring punctuation (a modifier letter) and the eternity symbol are also missing, and only one double quotation mark (U+2033) is encoded in code value 7A instead of double guillemets in the three ArmSCII variants.

However, this standard maps the Armenian full stop (whose glyph looks very close to the ASCII colon) in code value 4C and the Armenian abbreviation mark (that looks very similar to an angular grave accent) in code value 4F, that are both missing from all ArmSCII code charts.

Note that the characters encoded at code values 49 and 4A (Armenian apostrophe and hyphen) may not be visible with all fonts supporting Armenian.

=== Windows Paratype code page, replaced by ArmSCII-8 by 2005 ===
Windows Paratype code 8-bit coded character set for Armenian
	x0	x1	x2	x3	x4	x5	x6	x7	x8	x9	xA	xB	xC	xD	xE	xF
0x	unused															
1x	unused															
2x	SP	!	"	#	$	%	&	'	(	)	*	+	,	-	.	/
3x	0	1	2	3	4	5	6	7	8	9	:	;	<	=	>	?
4x	@	A	B	C	D	E	F	G	H	I	J	K	L	M	N	O
5x	P	Q	R	S	T	U	V	W	X	Y	Z	[	\	]		_
6x	`	a	b	c	d	e	f	g	h	i	j	k	l	m	n	o
7x	p	q	r	s	t	u	v	w	x	y	z	{	|	}	~	
8x			‚	ƒ	„	…	†	‡	ˆ	‰		‹	¤	§	©	®
9x	№	‘	’	“	”	•	—	—	˜	™		›	«	»	×	÷
Ax	NB; SP	Ա	Բ	Գ	Դ	Ե	Զ	Է	Ը	Թ	Ժ	Ի	Լ	Խ	Ծ	Կ
Bx	Հ	Ձ	Ղ	Ճ	Մ	Յ	Ն	Շ	Ո	Չ	Պ	Ջ	Ռ	Ս	Վ	Տ
Cx	Ր	Ց	Ւ	Փ	Ք	Օ	Ֆ					ՙ	՛	՜	՝	
Dx		ա	բ	գ	դ	ե	զ	է	ը	թ	ժ	ի	լ	խ	ծ	կ
Ex	հ	ձ	ղ	ճ	մ	յ	ն	շ	ո	չ	պ	ջ	ռ	ս	վ	տ
Fx	ր	ց	ւ	փ	ք	օ	ֆ		։							

This encoding is supported by FontLab Studio 5. This encoding was previously used by Paratype, but it was replaced by ARMSCII-8.

=== ISO/IEC 10646-1 and Unicode ===
Armenian^{[1]}^{[2]} Official Unicode Consortium code chart (PDF)
	0	1	2	3	4	5	6	7	8	9	A	B	C	D	E	F
U+053x		Ա	Բ	Գ	Դ	Ե	Զ	Է	Ը	Թ	Ժ	Ի	Լ	Խ	Ծ	Կ
U+054x	Հ	Ձ	Ղ	Ճ	Մ	Յ	Ն	Շ	Ո	Չ	Պ	Ջ	Ռ	Ս	Վ	Տ
U+055x	Ր	Ց	Ւ	Փ	Ք	Օ	Ֆ			ՙ	՚	՛	՜	՝	՞	՟
U+056x	ՠ	ա	բ	գ	դ	ե	զ	է	ը	թ	ժ	ի	լ	խ	ծ	կ
U+057x	հ	ձ	ղ	ճ	մ	յ	ն	շ	ո	չ	պ	ջ	ռ	ս	վ	տ
U+058x	ր	ց	ւ	փ	ք	օ	ֆ	և	ֈ	։	֊			֍	֎	֏
Notes 1.As of Unicode version 17.0 2.Grey areas indicate non-assigned code points

Armenian subset of Alphabetic Presentation Forms^{[1]} Official Unicode Consortium code chart (PDF)
	0	1	2	3	4	5	6	7	8	9	A	B	C	D	E	F
U+FB1x				ﬓ	ﬔ	ﬕ	ﬖ	ﬗ	(U+FB00–FB12, U+FB18–FB4F omitted)							
Notes 1.As of Unicode version 17.0

For comparison, this is the Unicode code points charts for Armenian.

Its encoding since Unicode 1.1 (except the Armenian hyphen U+058A, the last character added since Unicode 3.0) was based on the previous ISO 10585 7-bit international encoding standard, rather than on ArmsCII that was missing a dozen of characters present in ISO 10585. However, non-letters were reorganized by type, and some extensions have been added for rare Armenian characters that were missing in all past 7-bit and 8-bit standards.

Capital letters are encoded in the first half of the block (terminated by modifier letters).

Lowercase letters are encoded in the second half of the block (terminated by Armenian punctuation signs).

Unlike the ArmSCII encodings, this encoding is stable and portable across systems, and contain all characters needed for Armenian (with the exception of the Armenian eternity sign). Some Unicode-encoded fonts for Armenian are mapping the eternity sign at code point U+0530. This is incorrect, as that code point has been allocated in 2013 at U+58E, and another for its right-facing variant: U+58D.

However, no distinction is kept for the Armenian (mirrored) parenthesis, so the standard ASCII/Unicode punctuation must be used according to their usual rendering. The left half-ring mark (modifier letter) is encoded here, and some other marks are unified with other scripts (notably the quotation marks, middle dot and dashes).

Note that the characters encoded at code points U+055A and U+058A (Armenian apostrophe and hyphen, like in the charts for ArmsCII and ISO 10585), and as well as U+0559 (the modifier mark for numeric, added specifically into ISO 10646-1 and Unicode), may not be visible with all fonts supporting Armenian.

== Code mappings and classification ==
Note that some transcodings are shown below between parentheses. They are only approximation fallbacks but do not map exactly the intended character.

Subset	Character	Armenian description or usage	Short name	Encodings					Notes
Subset	Character	Armenian description or usage	Short name	ArmSCII-7	ArmSCII-8	ArmSCII-8A	ISO 10585	Unicode ISO/IEC 10646	Notes
General purpose		space	space	20	20	20	20	0020	same as ASCII and Unicode
General purpose		non-breaking space	nbsp	(20)	A0	FF	(20)	00A0	missing in ArmSCII-7 and ISO 10585
Armenian symbols	֎	eternity sign	armeternity	21	A1	DC	—	058E	right-facing variant at U+058D
Armenian symbols	և	ligature ech yiwn (ew)	armew	(3B,75)	(26) (or BB,F5)	(26) (or 89,F5)	(55,72)	0587 (or 0565,0582)	specific to Armenian : compatibility ligature of Armenian ech (yech) and yiwn (vyun) small letters, used as a symbol (similar to ampersand symbol in ASCII)
Armenian symbols	§	section sign	armsection	22	A2	—	—	00A7	from ISO 8859; missing in all ArmSCII variants
Armenian punctuation	։	full stop (vertsaket)	armfullstop	23	A3	(3A)	4C	0589	specific to Armenian : looks mostly like ASCII colon, but distinct usage; missing in ArmSCII-8A (approximated by ASCII colon)
Armenian punctuation	)	right parenthesis	armparenright	24	A4	29	(79)	0029	from ASCII, name and usage different and Unicode; missing in ISO 10585 (suggested substitution uses dashes)
Armenian punctuation	(	left parenthesis	armparenleft	25	A5	28	(79)	0028	from ASCII, name and usage different and Unicode; missing in ISO 10585 (suggested substitution uses dashes)
Armenian punctuation	»	right quotation mark	armquotright	26	A6	AF	(7A)	00BB	from ISO-8859, name and usage different and Unicode
Armenian punctuation	«	left quotation mark	armquotleft	27	A7	AE	(7A)	00AB	from ISO-8859, name and usage different and Unicode
Armenian punctuation	″	quotation mark	—	—	(22)	(22)	7A	2033	used for either left or right quotation mark in ISO 10585; missing in ArmSCII-8/8A (approximated by ASCII double quotation mark)
Armenian punctuation	—	em-dash	armemdash	28	A8	(5F)	78	2014	from ISO-8859; missing in ArmSCII-8A (approximated by ASCII underscore)
Armenian punctuation	․	middle dot (mijaket)	armdot	29	A9	(2E)	7C	2024	sometimes similar to ASCII full stop, but usage different in Armenian where the middle dot is preferred; missing in ArmSCII-8A (approximated by ASCII full stop)
Armenian punctuation	՝	separation mark (but)	armsep	2A	AA	(60)	48	055D	usage specific to Armenian : used as a comma; = bowt; missing in ArmSCII-8A (approximated by ASCII backquote)
Armenian punctuation	,	comma	armcomma	2B	AB	2C	4D	002C	same as ASCII and Unicode comma
Armenian punctuation	‐	dash	armendash	2C	AC	(2D)	79	2010	similar to the short variant of the ASCII and Unicode minus-hyphen (shorter than the general purpose minus sign used in ASCII); missing in ArmSCII-8A (approximated by ASCII minus-hyphen)
Armenian modifier letters	֊	hyphen (yentamna)	armyentamna	2D	AD	DD	4A	058A	specific to Armenian : a modifier letter that modifies another Armenian normal letter (possibly with combining punctuation between them)
Armenian modifier letters	…	ellipsis	armellipsis	2E	AE	DE	(7C,7C,7C)	2026	from ISO-8859, but not a punctuation : a modifier letter that follows and modifies another normal Armenian letter (possibly with combining punctuation between them)
Armenian modifier letters	ՙ	numeric mark (left half-ring)	armnum	—	—	—	—	0559	specific to Armenian : a modifier letter that modifies another Armenian normal letter (possibly with combining punctuation between them); missing in all ArmSCII variants
Armenian modifier letters	՚	apostrophe (right half-ring)	armapostrophe	7E	FE	FE	49	055A	specific to Armenian : a modifier letter that modifies another Armenian normal letter (possibly with combining punctuation between them)
Armenian combining punctuation	՜	exclamation mark (amanak)	armexclam	2F	AF	(7E)	7E	055C	specific to Armenian : these diacritics encode punctuation but may appear on top of a letter in the middle of any word (it may be ignored in searches); Unicode handles them as modifier letters. However, they are normally not spacing; = batsaganchakan nshan; missing in ArmSCII-8A (approximated by ASCII tilde symbol)
Armenian combining punctuation	՛	emphasis mark (shesht)	armaccent	30	B0	(27)	7D	055B	specific to Armenian : these diacritics encode punctuation but may appear on top of a letter in the middle of any word (it may be ignored in searches); Unicode handles them as modifier letters. However, they are normally not spacing; missing in ArmSCII-8A (approximated by ASCII single quote)
Armenian combining punctuation	՞	question mark (paruyk)	armquestion	31	B1	DF	4E	055E	specific to Armenian : these diacritics encode punctuation but may appear on top of a letter in the middle of any word (it may be ignored in searches); Unicode handles them as modifier letters. However, they are normally not spacing; = hartsakan nshan
Armenian combining punctuation	՟	abbreviation mark (patiw)	armabbrev	—	—	—	4F	055F	specific to Armenian : these diacritics encode punctuation but may appear on top of a letter in the middle of any word (it may be ignored in searches); Unicode handles them as modifier letters. However, they are normally not spacing
Armenian capital letters	Ա	Ayb	Armayb	32	B2	80	21	0531	
Armenian capital letters	Բ	Ben	Armben	34	B4	82	22	0532	
Armenian capital letters	Գ	Gim	Armgim	36	B6	84	23	0533	
Armenian capital letters	Դ	Da	Armda	38	B8	86	24	0534	
Armenian capital letters	Ե	Ech (Yech)	Armyech	3A	BA	88	25	0535	
Armenian capital letters	Զ	Za	Armza	3C	BC	8A	26	0536	
Armenian capital letters	Է	Eh (E)	Arme	3E	BE	8C	27	0537	
Armenian capital letters	Ը	Et (At)	Armat	40	C0	8E	28	0538	
Armenian capital letters	Թ	To	Armto	42	C2	90	29	0539	
Armenian capital letters	Ժ	Zhe	Armzhe	44	C4	92	2A	053A	
Armenian capital letters	Ի	Ini	Armini	46	C6	94	2B	053B	
Armenian capital letters	Լ	Liwn (Lyun)	Armlyun	48	C8	96	2C	053C	
Armenian capital letters	Խ	Xeh (Khe)	Armkhe	4A	CA	98	2D	053D	
Armenian capital letters	Ծ	Ca (Tsa)	Armtsa	4C	CC	9A	2E	053E	
Armenian capital letters	Կ	Ken	Armken	4E	CE	9C	2F	053F	
Armenian capital letters	Հ	Ho	Armho	50	D0	9E	30	0540	
Armenian capital letters	Ձ	Ja (Dza)	Armdza	52	D2	A0	31	0541	
Armenian capital letters	Ղ	Ghad (Ghat)	Armghat	54	D4	A2	32	0542	
Armenian capital letters	Ճ	Cheh (Tche)	Armtche	56	D6	A4	33	0543	
Armenian capital letters	Մ	Men	Armmen	58	D8	A6	34	0544	
Armenian capital letters	Յ	Yi (Hi)	Armhi	5A	DA	A8	35	0545	
Armenian capital letters	Ն	Now (Nu)	Armnu	5C	DC	AA	36	0546	
Armenian capital letters	Շ	Sha	Armsha	5E	DE	AC	37	0547	
Armenian capital letters	Ո	Vo	Armvo	60	E0	E0	38	0548	
Armenian capital letters	Չ	Cha	Armcha	62	E2	E2	39	0549	
Armenian capital letters	Պ	Peh (Pe)	Armpe	64	E4	E4	3A	054A	
Armenian capital letters	Ջ	Jheh (Je)	Armje	66	E6	E6	3B	054B	
Armenian capital letters	Ռ	Ra	Armra	68	E8	E8	3C	054C	
Armenian capital letters	Ս	Seh (Se)	Armse	6A	EA	EA	3D	054D	
Armenian capital letters	Վ	Vew (Vev)	Armvev	6C	EC	EC	3E	054E	
Armenian capital letters	Տ	Tiwn (Tyun)	Armtyun	6E	EE	EE	3F	054F	
Armenian capital letters	Ր	Reh (Re)	Armre	70	F0	F0	40	0550	
Armenian capital letters	Ց	Co (Tso)	Armtso	72	F2	F2	41	0551	
Armenian capital letters	Ւ	Yiwn (Vyun)	Armvyun	74	F4	F4	42	0552	
Armenian capital letters	Փ	Piwr (Pyur)	Armpyur	76	F6	F6	43	0553	
Armenian capital letters	Ք	Keh (Ke)	Armke	78	F8	F8	44	0554	
Armenian capital letters	Օ	Oh (O)	Armo	7A	FA	FA	45	0555	
Armenian capital letters	Ֆ	Feh (Fe)	Armfe	7C	FC	FC	46	0556	
Armenian small letters	ա	ayb	armayb	33	B3	81	51	0561	
Armenian small letters	բ	ben	armben	35	B5	83	52	0562	
Armenian small letters	գ	gim	armgim	37	B7	85	53	0563	
Armenian small letters	դ	da	armda	39	B9	87	54	0564	
Armenian small letters	ե	ech (yech)	armyech	3B	BB	89	55	0565	
Armenian small letters	զ	za	armza	3D	BD	8B	56	0566	
Armenian small letters	է	eh (e)	arme	3F	BF	8D	57	0567	
Armenian small letters	ը	et (at)	armat	41	C1	8F	58	0568	
Armenian small letters	թ	to	armto	43	C3	91	59	0569	
Armenian small letters	ժ	zhe	armzhe	45	C5	93	5A	056A	
Armenian small letters	ի	ini	armini	47	C7	95	5B	056B	
Armenian small letters	լ	liwn (lyun)	armlyun	49	C9	97	5C	056C	
Armenian small letters	խ	xeh (khe)	armkhe	4B	CB	99	5D	056D	
Armenian small letters	ծ	ca (tsa)	armtsa	4D	CD	9B	5E	056E	
Armenian small letters	կ	ken	armken	4F	CF	9D	5F	056F	
Armenian small letters	հ	ho	armho	51	D1	9F	60	0570	
Armenian small letters	ձ	ja (dza)	armdza	53	D3	A1	61	0571	
Armenian small letters	ղ	ghad (ghat)	armghat	55	D5	A3	62	0572	
Armenian small letters	ճ	cheh (tche)	armtche	57	D7	A5	63	0573	
Armenian small letters	մ	men	armmen	59	D9	A7	64	0574	
Armenian small letters	յ	yi (hi)	armhi	5B	DB	A9	65	0575	
Armenian small letters	ն	now (nu)	armnu	5D	DD	AB	66	0576	
Armenian small letters	շ	sha	armsha	5F	DF	AD	67	0577	
Armenian small letters	ո	vo	armvo	61	E1	E1	68	0578	
Armenian small letters	չ	cha	armcha	63	E3	E3	69	0579	
Armenian small letters	պ	peh (pe)	armpe	65	E5	E5	6A	057A	
Armenian small letters	ջ	jheh (je)	armje	67	E7	E7	6B	057B	
Armenian small letters	ռ	ra	armra	69	E9	E9	6C	057C	
Armenian small letters	ս	she (se)	armse	6B	EB	EB	6D	057D	
Armenian small letters	վ	vew (vev)	armvev	6D	ED	ED	6E	057E	
Armenian small letters	տ	tiwn (tyun)	armtyun	6F	EF	EF	6F	057F	
Armenian small letters	ր	reh (re)	armre	71	F1	F1	70	0580	
Armenian small letters	ց	co (tso)	armtso	73	F3	F3	71	0581	
Armenian small letters	ւ	yiwn (vyun)	armvyun	75	F5	F5	72	0582	
Armenian small letters	փ	piwr (pyur)	armpyur	77	F7	F7	73	0583	
Armenian small letters	ք	keh (ke)	armke	79	F9	F9	74	0584	
Armenian small letters	օ	oh (o)	armo	7B	FB	FB	75	0585	
Armenian small letters	ֆ	feh (fe)	armfe	7D	FD	FD	76	0586	

== See also ==
- Armenian alphabet
- Armenian language
- Romanization of Armenian (including ISO 9985 standard)
- Classical Armenian orthography
- Reformed Armenian orthography
- Armenian calendar
- Category:ISO standards (646, 9985, 10585 and 10646-1)
