= Shelf support =

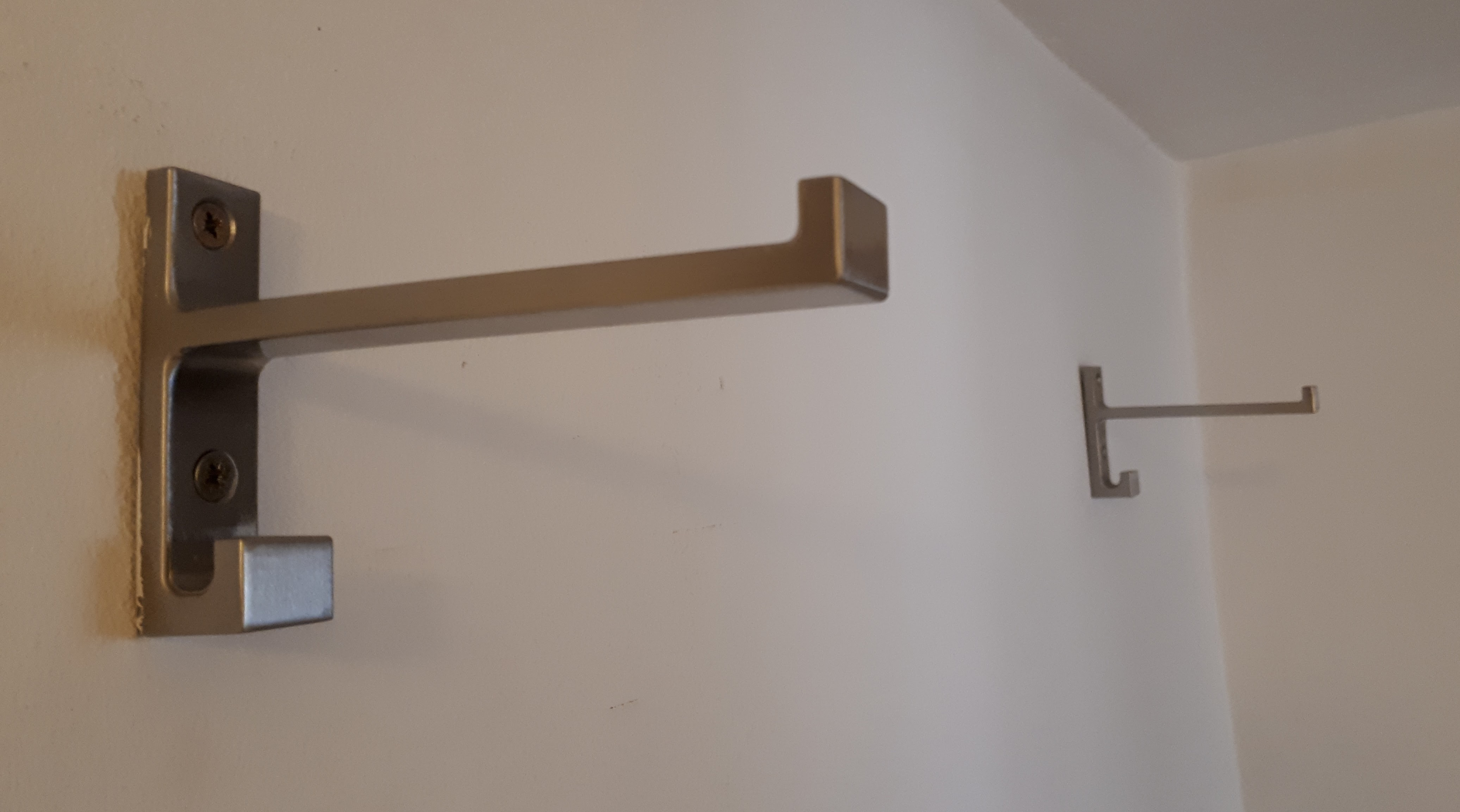
Two stainless steel shelf supports

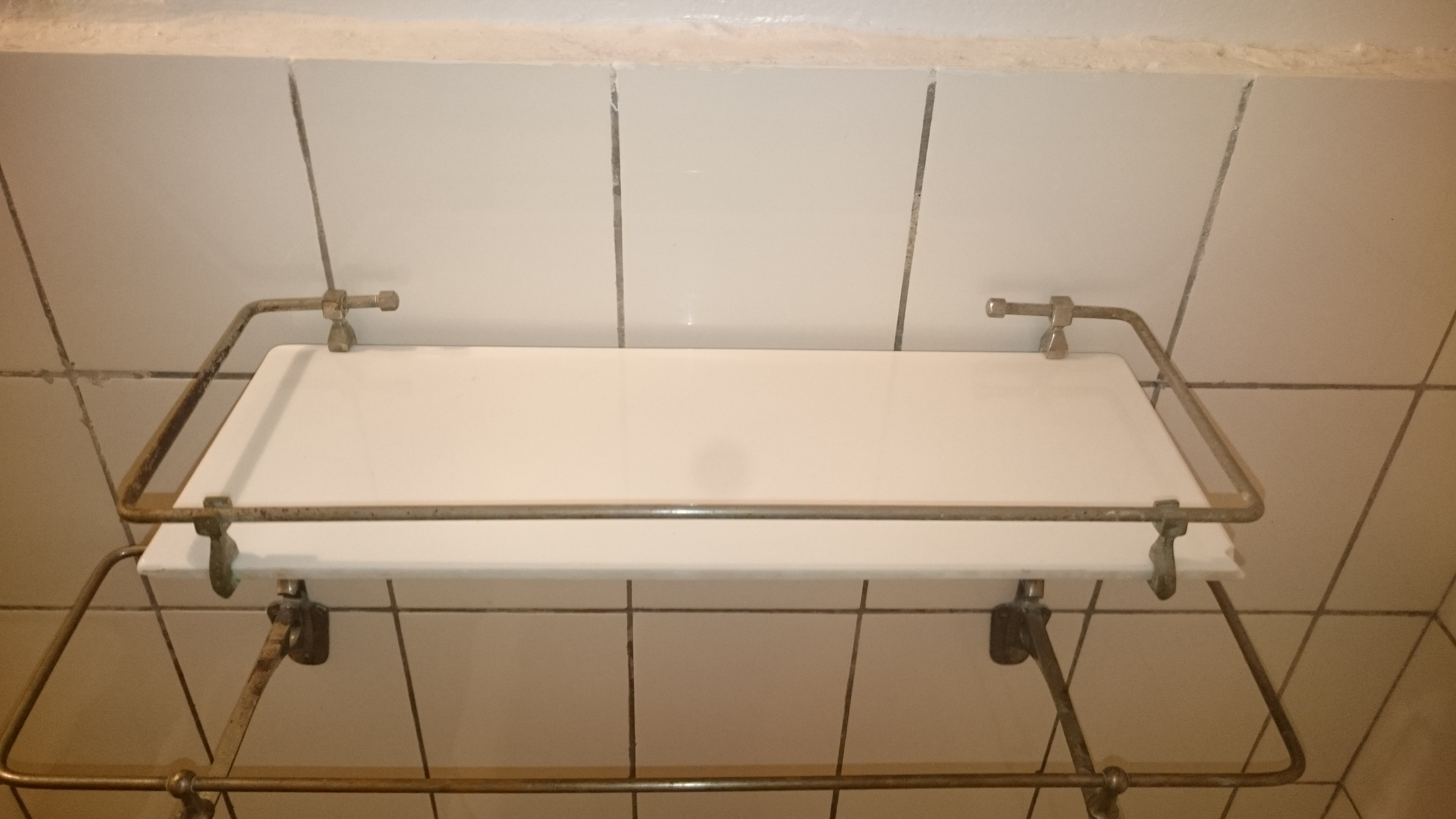
Shelf supports holding the shelf and a metallic frame on top of it

A shelf support is a fastener used to hang a shelf from a wall. It can be an alternative to built-in shelving or adjustable shelving.

There are several different types of shelf supports. A very common variant is an L-shaped shelf support, which is also called shelf bracket, and can be seen as a subset of angle brackets. There are also other forms of plug-in shelf supports commonly used in a wardrobes or cabinets (cabinet shelf support, wardrobe shelf support, shelf pin, shelf support peg, shelf support push).

== See also ==
- Bracket (architecture)
- French cleats
- The 32 mm system on frameless cabinets using 5 mm diameter studs spaced 32 mm apart
