= ISO 11170 =

Published standard

ISO 11170:2003 is an international standard which defines a sequence of tests for verifying filter elements. It can be used to check their hydraulic, mechanical and separation characteristics. ISO 11170 is not intended to qualify a filter for a particular duty or replicate conditions of service. This can only be done by a specific test protocol developed for the purpose, including actual conditions of use (for example the operating fluid). The procedure in ISO 11170 is applicable to individual fluids, or types of fluid having similar chemistry.
