= ISO/IEC 10021 =

ISO/IEC 10021 is a standard published by the International Organization for Standardization and the International Electrotechnical Commission which defines a reference system architecture for message handling systems.

== Parts ==
- ISO/IEC 10021-1:2003 Part 1: System and service overview
- ISO/IEC 10021-2:2003 Overall architecture
- ISO/IEC 10021-4:2003 Message transfer system – Abstract service definition and procedures
- ISO/IEC 10021-5:1999 Message store: Abstract service definition
- ISO/IEC 10021-6:2003 Protocol specifications
- ISO/IEC 10021-7:2003 Interpersonal messaging system
- ISO/IEC 10021-8:1999 Part 8: Electronic Data Interchange Messaging Service
- ISO/IEC 10021-9:1999 Electronic Data Interchange Messaging System
- ISO/IEC 10021-10:1999 MHS routing
- ISO/IEC TR 10021-11:1999 MHS Routing – Guide for messaging systems managers

== See also ==
- ISO/IEC JTC 1/SC 6
