= ISO 10014 =

ISO 10014:2006 Quality management – Guidelines for realizing financial and economic benefits with ISO 9001:2000 is an International standard issued by the International Organization for Standardization that is intended to provide "clear guidelines on achieving financial and economic benefits" from the application of the ISO 9000 quality management principles.

According to the ISO:

"This International Standard is addressed to top management. It provides guidelines for realizing financial and economic benefits through the effective application of eight quality management principles derived from ISO 9000:2005. These principles are subsequently referred to as “management principles” within the body of this standard. This document intends to provide top management with information to facilitate effective application of management principles and selection of methods and tools that enable the sustainable success of an organization".

A predecessor standard, "PD ISO/TR 10014:1998 Guidelines for managing the economics of quality" was withdrawn with the adoption of ISO 10014:2006.
