= Guidelines for the Definition of Managed Objects =

Guideline used in Telecommunications Management Network

The Guidelines for the Definition of Managed Objects (GDMO) is a specification for defining managed objects of interest to the Telecommunications Management Network (TMN) for use in the Common Management Information Protocol (CMIP).

GDMO to the Structure of Management Information for defining a management information base for Simple Network Management Protocol (SNMP). For example, both represent a hierarchy of managed objects and use ASN.1 for syntax.

GDMO is defined in ISO/IEC 10165 and ITU-T X.722.
