= Angle bracket (fastener) =

Structural fastener

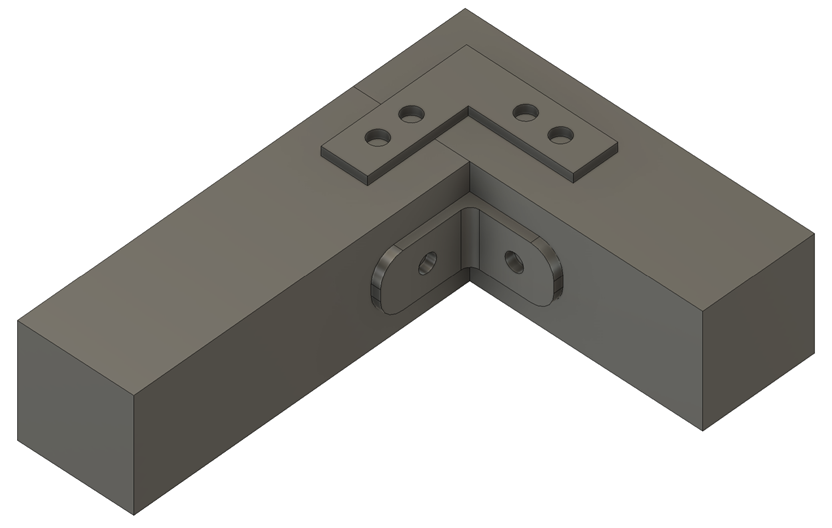
A flat angle bracket (top) on the side of a butt joint, and a bent angle bracket (bottom), here on the inside corner, but may also be used on the outside corner

An angle bracket, angle brace, or angle cleat is an L-shaped fastener used to join two parts generally at a 90-degree angle. It is typically made of metal but it can also be made of wood or plastic. Angle brackets feature holes in them for screws.

A typical example use of is a shelf bracket for mounting a shelf on a wall. In general, angle brackets have a wide range of applications, and are used, among other things, in building construction, mechanical engineering or to join two pieces of furniture

Retailers also use names like corner brace (not to be confused with corner bracing in cross bracing), corner bracket brace, shelf bracket, or L bracket. When the holes are enlarged for allowing adjustments, the name is angle stretcher plates or angle shrinkage.

== Types ==
There are different sizes available, varying in length, width and angle.

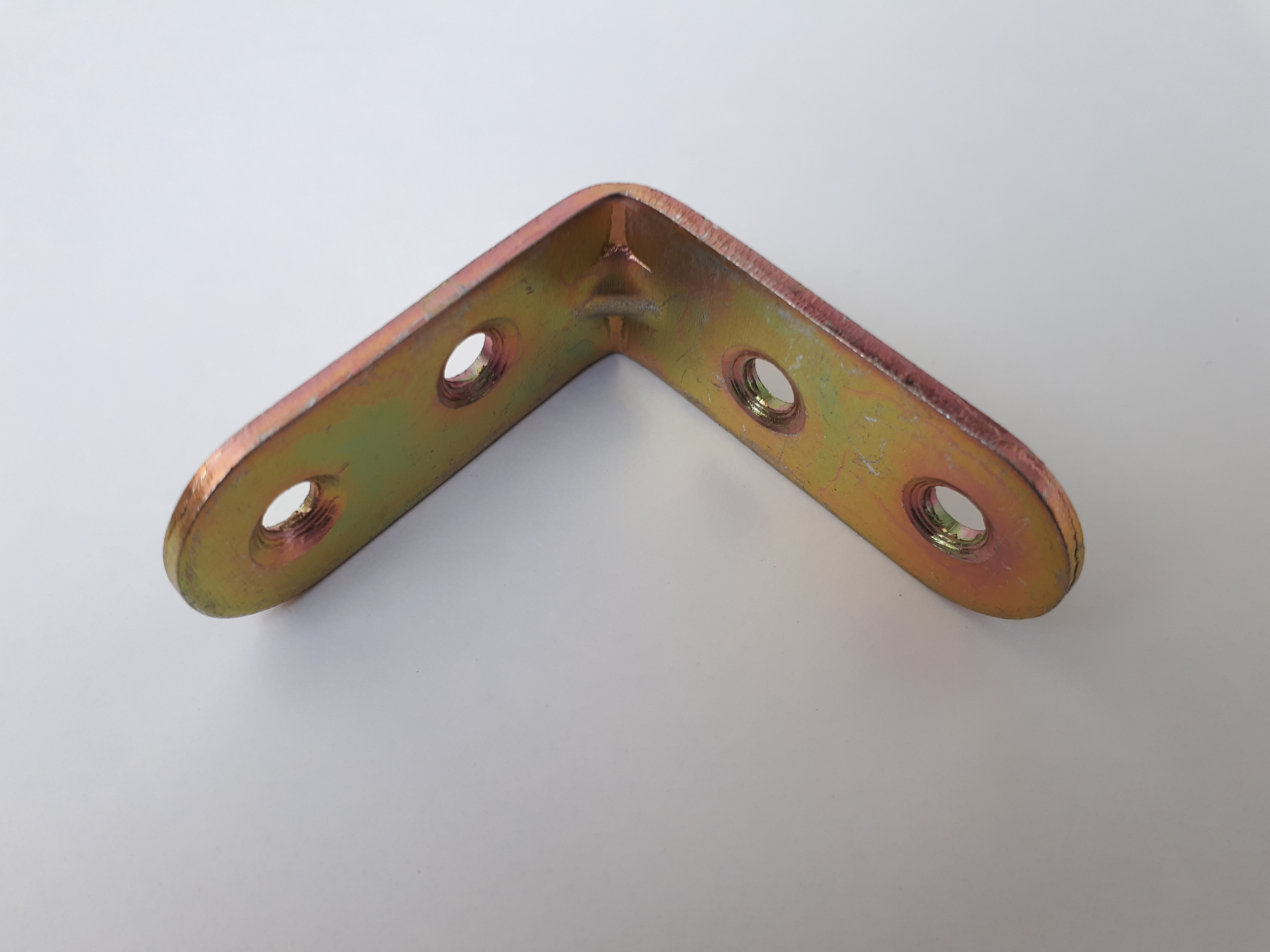
Steel angle bracket with passivated zinc corrosion protection

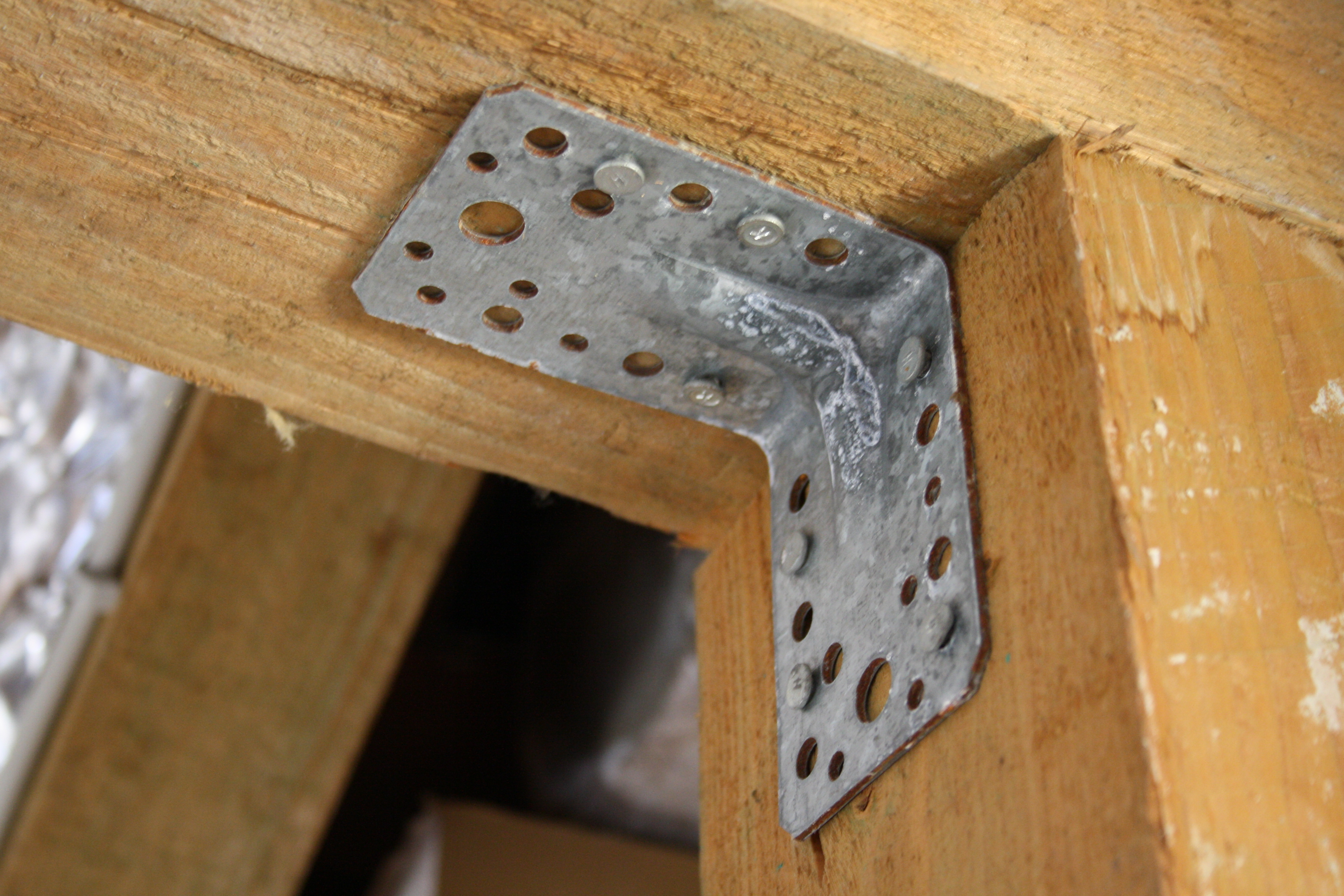
Angle bracket of galvanized steel used in a roof construction

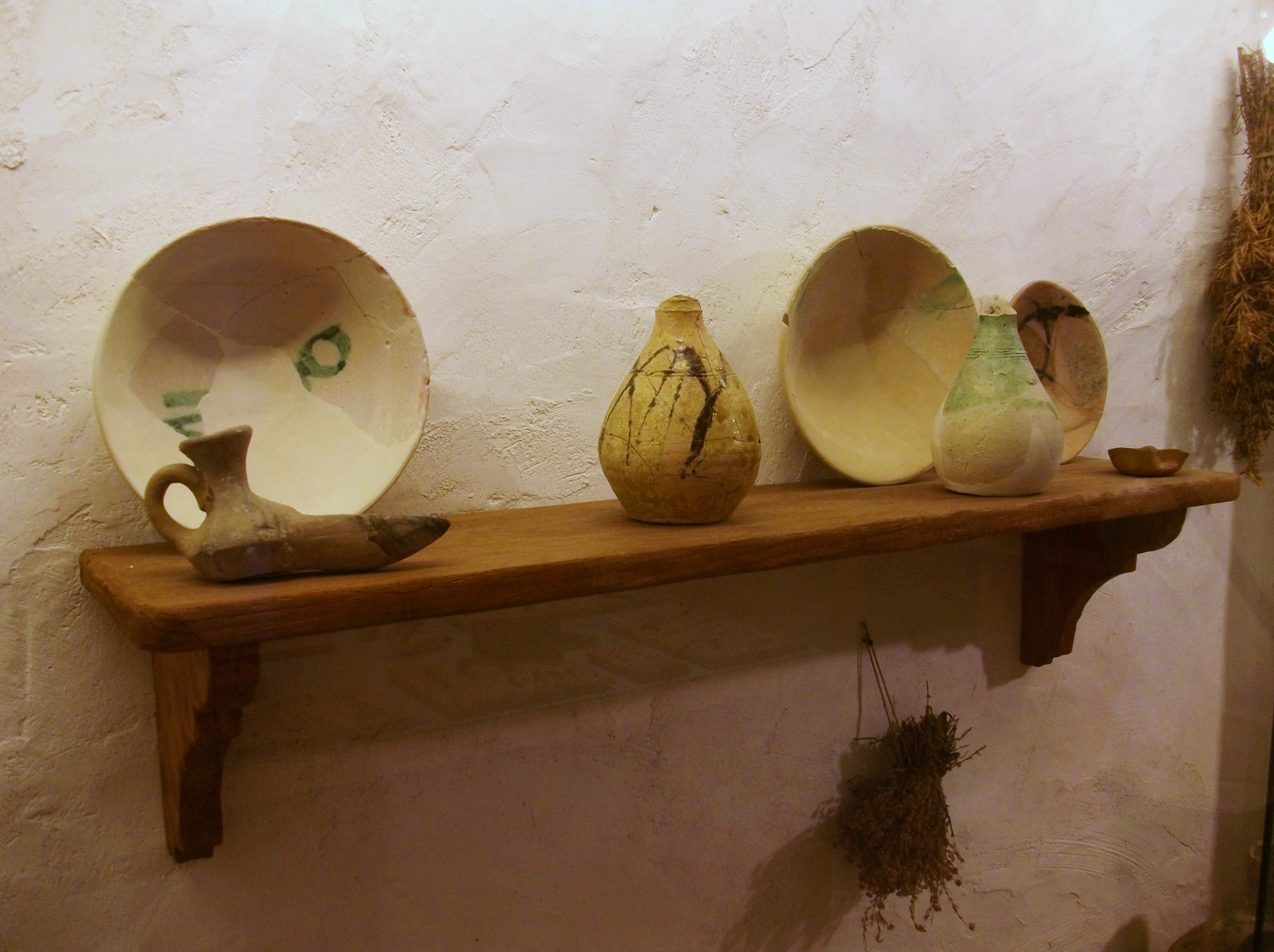
A shelf hung on the wall using two wooden angle brackets as shelf supports

== See also ==
- Shelf supports have many variations, including angle brackets
