= Interface:2010 =

The Interface Marketing Supplier Integration Institute
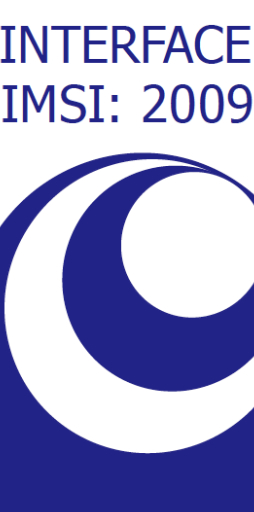
- Formation: 23 February 2009
- Type: NGO
- Purpose: International standardization
- Headquarters: Geneva, Switzerland
- Members: 11 members
- Official language: English and French

Interface:2010 is The Interface Marketing Supplier Integration Institute, widely known as INTERFACE and IMSI, is an international-standard-setting body composed of representatives from various national marketing and supply chain management organizations. Founded on 11 March 2009, the organization promulgates worldwide proprietary marketing supplier integration standards. It is headquartered in Geneva, Switzerland. While IMSI defines itself as a non-governmental organization, its ability to improve the marketing supply chain, reduce costs and eliminate risk makes the IMSI highly influential within the government sector.

IMSI proves a framework that allows suppliers of marketing services, including fulfillment providers, call centers, and online marketers, to integrate back-office functions such as data transfer, customer relationship management (CRM), and billing. It supports partner organizations in delivering end-to-end marketing service management.

The standards established by iMSI enable approved organizations to operate within a unified service and billing structure for clients managing direct marketing and CRM activities. IMSI also seeks to provide a single point of contact and accountability for end users, while allowing access to specialized service providers. Member organizations are often, though not exclusively, ISO accredited.

The standard fully complies with the PCI DSS standards.

== Member Organizations ==
- Impact Lists (marketing data, mailing lists, business lists)
- The Prospect Shop (marketing data, mailing lists, targeting advice)
- URSA Communications (full service advertising agency)
- Unity4 (remote agent call centre services)
- Premium Fulfilment Services(Australia's leading provider of product management systems)
- Rapportcms (Call centre technology)
- Partizan Patient Support (medical patient support and adherence services)
- Morgan & Dunn (Consumer Credit, Commercial Debt Recovery)
- Marquecoms (PCI DSS Consultancy & Audit Services)

== See also ==
- PCI DSS, Payment Card Industry Data Security Standard
- American National Standards Institute (ANSI)
- Deutsches Institut für Normung, German Institute for Standardization (DIN)
- British Standards Institution (BSI)
- Countries in International Organization for Standardization
- Canadian Standards Association
- European Committee for Standardization (CEN)
- Commonwealth of Independent States (CIS) set of standards (GOST)
- International Classification for Standards
- International Electrotechnical Commission (IEC) and ISO/IEC standards
- International healthcare accreditation
- International Telecommunication Union (ITU)
- ISO 216
- ISO country code
- List of ISO standards
- ISO divisions
  - ISO/TC 37
  - ISO/TC 68
  - TC 46/SC 9
  - ISO/TC 211
  - ISO/TC 215
  - ISO/TC 223
- Standardization
- Standards Australia
- Standards organization
- Terminology planning policy
- The International Customer Service Institute (TICSI)
- CARICOM Regional Organisation for Standards and Quality (CROSQ)
- AP Stylebook (Associated Press Style)
- Interface:2010 (Interface Marketing Supplier Integration Institute)
