= Interactive computing =

Software which accepts input from humans as it runs

In computer science, interactive computing refers to software which accepts input from the user as it runs.

Interactive software includes commonly used programs, such as word processors or spreadsheet applications. By comparison, non-interactive programs operate without user intervention; examples of these include compilers and batch processing applications that are pre-programmed to run independently.

Interactive computing focuses on real-time interaction ("dialog") between the computer and the operator, and the technologies that enable them.

If the response of the computer system is complex enough, it is said that the system is conducting social interaction; some systems try to achieve this through the implementation of social interfaces.

The nature of interactive computing as well as its impact on users, are studied extensively in the field of computer interaction.

== History of interactive computing systems ==
Ivan Sutherland is considered the father of interactive computing for his work on Sketchpad, the interactive display graphics program he developed in 1963. He later worked at the ARPA Information Processing Techniques Office under the direction of J. C. R. Licklider.

There he facilitated ARPA's research grant to Douglas Engelbart for developing the NLS system at SRI, based on his visionary manifesto published in a 1962 report, in which Engelbart envisioned interactive computing as a vehicle for user interaction with computers, with each other, and with their knowledge, all in a vast virtual information space.

In a 1965 report, Engelbart published his early experiments with pointing devices, including the computer mouse, for composing and editing on interactive display workstations. Engelbart's work on interactive computing at SRI migrated directly to Xerox PARC, from there to Apple, and out into the mainstream. Thus, the tree of evolution for interactive computing generally traces back to Engelbart's lab at SRI.

In December 2008, on the 40th anniversary of his 1968 demo, SRI sponsored a public commemorative event in his honor.

== Current research ==
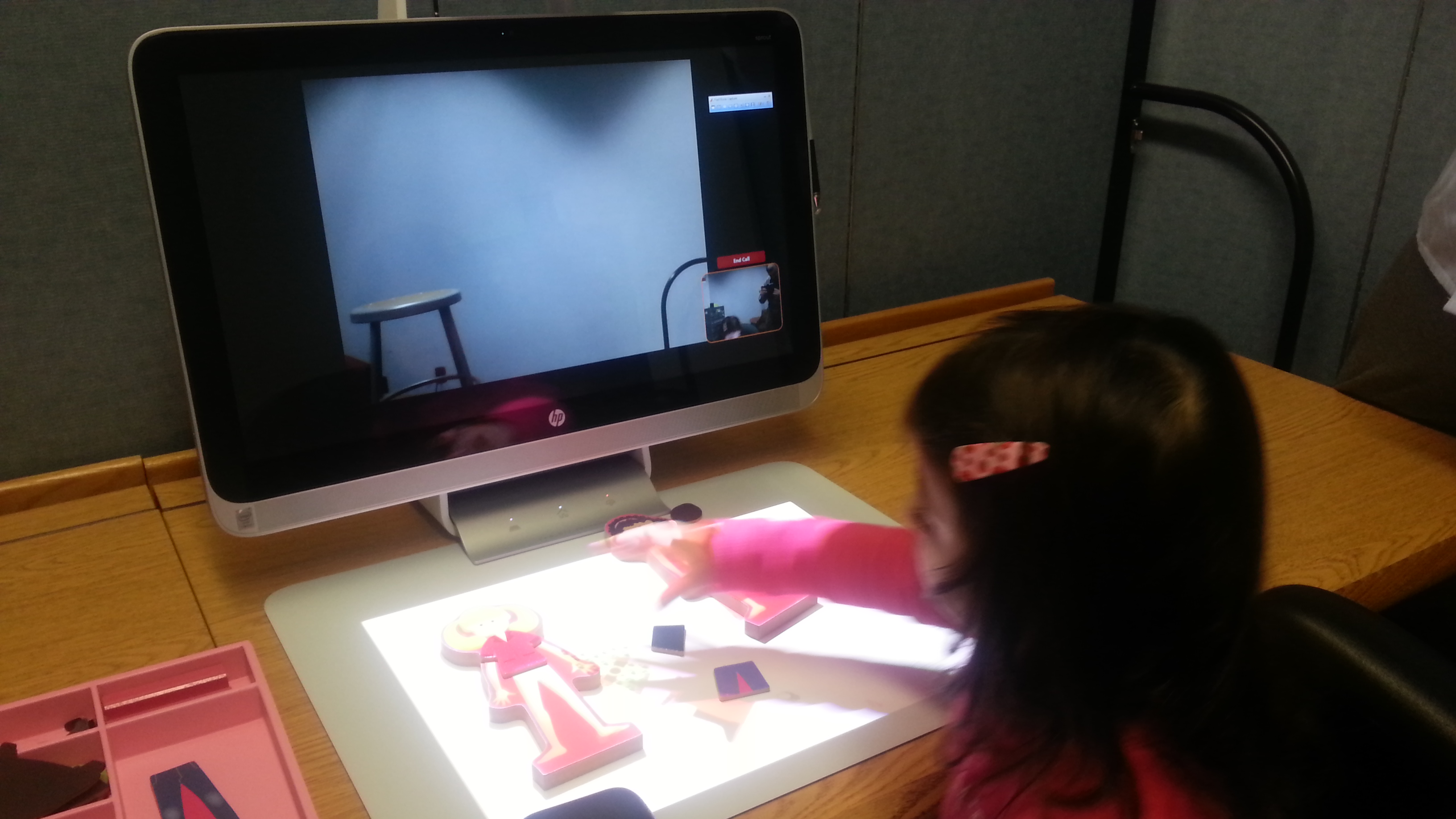
The HP Sprout, a projector camera interactive system.

The need for constant user interaction in interactive computing systems makes it different in many ways from batch processing systems.

Areas of current research include the design of novel programming models and achieving information security and reliability in interactive computing.

IPython is a software system for scientific interactive computing, supporting data visualization, event-driven programming and a number of related GUI toolkits.

The Georgia Institute of Technology's School of Interactive Computing formed in 2007, offering masters and doctoral degrees via collaboration with more than 40 faculties.

The Tangible Media Group of MIT, led by Professor Hiroshi Ishii, seeks to seamlessly couple the dual world of bits and atoms by presenting a dynamic physical form to computation.

== See also ==
- Interactivity
- Interactive computation
- Processing modes
- J. C. R. Licklider
- Douglas Engelbart
- Ubiquitous computing
