= List of ISO technical committees =

Error code reset

This is a list of ISO technical committees.

International Organization for Standardization (ISO) is a standards-making body, similar to the International Electrotechnical Commission (IEC). ISO works with National Committees in different countries in preparing and maintaining standards. ISO is the largest developer and publisher of international standards in the world.

== Committee list ==
The ISO standards making process, similar to many other standards making processes, is handled by various technical committees (TC). The TCs are the key bodies that drive the standardization and comprise experts from the national committees and are a completely voluntary effort.

This list is intended to detail the various technical committees of ISO, the scope of the committees, their key members and the key relevance and outputs of these committees.

Committee	Title	Notes
IEC/ISO JSyC BDC	IEC/ISO Joint Systems Committee on Bio-digital convergence (IEC/ISO JSyC BDC)	
ISO/IEC JTC 1	Information technology	
ISO/IEC JTC 2	Energy efficiency and renewable energy sources	Disbanded
ISO/IEC JTC 3	Quantum technologies	
TC 1	Screw threads	
TC 2	Fasteners	
TC 3	Limits and fits	Disbanded
TC 4	Rolling bearings	
TC 5	Ferrous metal pipes and metallic fittings	
TC 6	Paper, board and pulps	
TC 7	Rivets	Disbanded
TC 8	Ships and marine technology	
TC 9	Shipbuilding details for sea navigation	Disbanded
TC 10	Technical product documentation	
TC 11	Boilers and pressure vessels	STANDBY
TC 12	Quantities and units	
TC 13	Shaft heights of machinery	Disbanded
TC 14	Shafts for machinery and accessories	
TC 15	Coupling	Disbanded
TC 16	Keys and keyway	Disbanded
TC 17	Steel	
TC 18	Zinc and zinc alloys	STANDBY
TC 19	Preferred numbers	STANDBY
TC 20	Aircraft and space vehicles	
TC 21	Equipment for fire protection and fire fighting	
TC 22	Road vehicles	
TC 23	Tractors and machinery for agriculture and forestry	
TC 24	Particle characterization including sieving	
TC 25	Cast irons and pig irons	
TC 26	Copper and copper alloys	
TC 27	Coal and coke	
TC 28	Petroleum and related products, fuels and lubricants from natural or synthetic sources	
TC 29	Small tools	
TC 30	Measurement of fluid flow in closed conduits	
TC 31	Tyres, rims and valves	
TC 32	Splines and serrations	Disbanded
TC 33	Refractories	
TC 34	Food products	
TC 35	Paints and varnishes	
TC 36	Cinematography	
TC 37	Terminology and other language and content resources	
TC 38	Textiles	
TC 39	Machine tools	
TC 40	Upholstery filling materials	Disbanded
TC 41	Pulleys and belts (including veebelts)	
TC 42	Photography	
TC 43	Acoustics	
TC 44	Welding and allied processes	
TC 45	Rubber and rubber products	
TC 46	Information and documentation	
TC 47	Chemistry	
TC 48	Laboratory equipment	
TC 49	Thread tolerances	Disbanded
TC 50	Lac	Disbanded
TC 51	Pallets for unit load method of materials handling	
TC 52	Light gauge metal containers	
TC 53	Packages for frozen foods	Disbanded
TC 54	Essential oils	
TC 55	Sawn timber and sawlogs	Disbanded
TC 56	Mica	Disbanded
TC 57	Metrology and properties of surfaces	Disbanded
TC 58	Gas cylinders	
TC 59	Buildings and civil engineering works	
TC 60	Gears	
TC 61	Plastics	
TC 62	Preferred dimensions of wrought metal products	Disbanded
TC 63	Glass containers	
TC 64	Methods of testing fuel-using equipment	Disbanded
TC 65	Manganese and chromium ores	Disbanded
TC 66	Determination of viscosity	Disbanded
TC 67	Oil and gas industries including lower carbon energy	
TC 68	Financial services	
TC 69	Applications of statistical methods	
TC 70	Internal combustion engines	
TC 71	Concrete, reinforced concrete and pre-stressed concrete	
TC 72	Textile machinery and accessories	
TC 73	Consumer questions	Disbanded
TC 74	Cement and lime	
TC 75	Stretchers and stretcher carriers	Disbanded
TC 76	Transfusion, infusion and injection, and blood processing equipment for medical and pharmaceutical use	
TC 77	Products in fibre reinforced cement	
TC 78	Aromatic hydrocarbons	Disbanded
TC 79	Light metals and their alloys	
TC 80	Safety colours and signs	Disbanded
TC 81	Common names for pesticides and other agrochemicals	
TC 82	Mining	
TC 83	Sports and other recreational facilities and equipment	
TC 84	Devices for administration of medicinal products and catheters	
TC 85	Nuclear energy, nuclear technologies, and radiological protection	
TC 86	Refrigeration and air-conditioning	
TC 87	Cork	
TC 88	Pictorial markings for handling of goods	Disbanded
TC 89	Wood-based panels	
TC 90	Apparatus for testing milk and milk products	Disbanded
TC 91	Surface active agents	
TC 92	Fire safety	
TC 93	Starch (including derivatives and by-products)	
TC 94	Personal safety—Protective clothing and equipment	
TC 95	Office machines	Disbanded
TC 96	Cranes	
TC 97	Information processing systems	Merged into ISO/IEC JTC 1
TC 98	Bases for design of structures	
TC 99	Semi-manufactures of timber	Disbanded
TC 100	Chains and chain sprockets for power transmission and conveyors	
TC 101	Continuous mechanical handling equipment	STANDBY
TC 102	Iron ore and direct reduced iron	
TC 103	Packaging dimensions	Disbanded
TC 104	Freight containers	
TC 105	Steel wire ropes	
TC 106	Dentistry	
TC 107	Metallic and other inorganic coatings	
TC 108	Mechanical vibration, shock and condition monitoring	
TC 109	Oil and gas burners	
TC 110	Industrial trucks	
TC 111	Round steel link chains, chain slings, components and accessories	
TC 112	Vacuum technology	
TC 113	Hydrometry	
TC 114	Horology	
TC 115	Pumps	
TC 116	Space heating appliances	Disbanded
TC 117	Fans	
TC 118	Compressors and pneumatic tools, machines and equipment	
TC 119	Powder metallurgy	
TC 120	Leather	
TC 121	Anaesthetic and respiratory equipment	
TC 122	Packaging	
TC 123	Plain bearings	
TC 124	Industrial process control instruments	Disbanded
TC 125	Enclosures and conditions for testing	Disbanded
TC 126	Tobacco and tobacco products	
TC 127	Earth-moving machinery	
TC 128	Glass plant, pipeline and fittings	Disbanded
TC 129	Aluminium ores	Disbanded
TC 130	Graphic technology	
TC 131	Fluid power systems	
TC 132	Ferroalloys	
TC 133	Clothing sizing systems - size designation, size measurement methods and digital fittings	
TC 134	Fertilizers and soil conditioners	
TC 135	Non-destructive testing	
TC 136	Furniture	
TC 137	Footwear sizing designations and marking systems	
TC 138	Plastics pipes, fittings and valves for the transport of fluids	
TC 139	Plywood	Disbanded
TC 140	Floorings	Disbanded
TC 141	Powered lawn and garden equipment	Disbanded
TC 142	Cleaning equipment for air and other gases	
TC 143	Pyrites and pyrites ash	Disbanded
TC 144	Air distribution and air diffusion	Disbanded
TC 145	Graphical symbols	
TC 146	Air quality	
TC 147	Water quality	
TC 148	Sewing machines	
TC 149	Cycles	
TC 150	Implants for surgery	
TC 151	Particle boards	Disbanded
TC 152	Gypsum, gypsum plasters and gypsum products	Disbanded
TC 153	Valves	
TC 154	Processes, data elements and documents in commerce, industry and administration	
TC 155	Nickel and nickel alloys	
TC 156	Corrosion of metals and alloys	
TC 157	Non-systemic contraceptives and STI barrier prophylactics	
TC 158	Analysis of gases	
TC 159	Ergonomics	
TC 160	Glass in building	
TC 161	Control and protective devices for gas and/or oil	
TC 162	Doors and windows	
TC 163	Thermal performance and energy use in the built environment	
TC 164	Mechanical testing of metals	
TC 165	Timber structures	
TC 166	Ceramic ware, glassware and glass ceramic ware in contact with food	
TC 167	Steel and aluminium structures	
TC 168	Prosthetics and orthotics	
TC 169	Fish-meal	Disbanded
TC 170	Surgical instruments	
TC 171	Document management applications	
TC 172	Optics and photonics	
TC 173	Assistive products for persons with disability	
TC 174	Jewellery and precious metals	
TC 175	Fluorspar	Disbanded
TC 176	Quality management and quality assurance	
TC 177	Caravans	Disbanded
TC 178	Lifts, escalators and moving walks	
TC 179	Masonry	Disbanded
TC 180	Solar energy	
TC 181	Safety of toys	
TC 182	Geotechnics	
TC 183	Copper, lead, zinc and nickel ores and concentrates	
TC 184	Automation systems and integration	
TC 185	Safety devices for protection against excessive pressure	
TC 186	Cutlery and table and decorative metal hollow-ware	
TC 187	Colour notations	Disbanded
TC 188	Small craft	
TC 189	Ceramic tile	
TC 190	Soil quality	
TC 191	Animal (mammal) traps	STANDBY
TC 192	Gas turbines	
TC 193	Natural gas	
TC 194	Biological evaluation of medical devices	
TC 195	Building construction machinery and equipment	
TC 196	Natural stone	Disbanded
TC 197	Hydrogen technologies	
TC 198	Sterilization of health care products	
TC 199	Safety of machinery	
TC 200	Solid wastes	Disbanded
TC 201	Surface chemical analysis	
TC 202	Microbeam analysis	
TC 203	Technical energy systems	Disbanded
TC 204	Intelligent transport systems	
TC 205	Building environment design	
TC 206	Fine ceramics	
TC 207	Environmental management	
TC 208	Thermal turbines for industrial application (steam turbines, gas expansion turbines)	Disbanded
TC 209	Cleanrooms and associated controlled environments	
TC 210	Quality management and corresponding general aspects for medical devices	
TC 211	Geographic information/Geomatics	
TC 212	Clinical laboratory testing and in vitro diagnostic test systems	
TC 213	Dimensional and geometrical product specifications and verification	
TC 214	Elevating work platforms	
TC 215	Health informatics	
TC 216	Footwear	
TC 217	Cosmetics	
TC 218	Timber	
TC 219	Floor coverings	
TC 220	Cryogenic vessels	
TC 221	Geosynthetics	
TC 222	Personal financial planning	STANDBY
TC 223	Societal Security	Merged into TC 292
TC 224	Service activities relating to drinking water supply systems and wastewater systems - Quality criteria of the service and performance indicators	
TC 225	Market, opinion and social research	
TC 226	Materials for the production of primary aluminium	
TC 227	Springs	
TC 228	Tourism and related services	
TC 229	Nanotechnologies	
TC 230	Project Committee: Psychological assessment	Disbanded
TC 231	Project Committee: Brand valuation (Now ISO/TC 289 Brand evaluation)	Disbanded
TC 232	Learning services outside formal education	
TC 233	Project Committee: Cleaning services	Disbanded
TC 234	Fisheries and aquaculture	
TC 235	Project Committee: Rating services	Disbanded
TC 236	Project Committee: Project Management (Now ISO/TC 258 Project, programme and portfolio management)	Disbanded
TC 237	Project committee: Exhibition terminology	Disbanded
TC 238	Solid biofuels	
TC 239	Project Committee: Network services billing	Disbanded
TC 240	Project Committee: Product recall	Disbanded
TC 241	Road traffic safety management systems	
TC 242	Energy Management	Disbanded
TC 243	Project Committee: Consumer product safety	Disbanded
TC 244	Industrial furnaces and associated thermal processing equipment	
PC 245	Project Committee: Cross-border trade of second-hand goods	Disbanded
TC 246	Project committee: Anti-counterfeiting tools (see ISO/TC 292 Security)	Disbanded
TC 247	Fraud countermeasures and controls (see ISO/TC 292 Security)	Merged into TC 292
TC 248	Project committee: Sustainability criteria for bioenergy	Disbanded
TC 249	Traditional Chinese medicine	
PC 250	Project committee: Sustainability in event management	
TC 251	Asset management	
PC 252	Project committee: Natural gas fuelling stations for vehicles	Disbanded
TC 253	Project committee: Treated wastewater re-use for irrigation	Disbanded
TC 254	Safety of amusement rides and amusement devices	
TC 255	Biogas	
TC 256	Pigments, dyestuffs and extenders	
TC 257	Energy savings	Disbanded
TC 258	Project, programme and portfolio management	
PC 259	Project committee: Outsourcing	Disbanded
TC 260	Human resource management	
TC 261	Additive manufacturing	
TC 262	Risk management	
TC 263	Coalbed methane (CBM)	
TC 264	Fireworks	
TC 265	Carbon dioxide capture, transportation, and geological storage	
TC 266	Biomimetics	
TC 267	Facilities management	
TC 268	Sustainable cities and communities	
TC 269	Railway applications	
TC 270	Plastics and rubber machines	
PC 271	Project committee: Compliance programs	Disbanded
TC 272	Forensic sciences	
PC 273	Project committee: Customer contact centres	Disbanded
TC 274	Light and lighting	
TC 275	Sludge recovery, recycling, treatment and disposal	
TC 276	Biotechnology	
PC 277	Project committee: Sustainable procurement	Disbanded
PC 278	Project committee: Anti-bribery management system - Requirements	Disbanded
TC 279	Innovation management	
PC 280	Project committee: Management consultancy	Disbanded
TC 281	Fine bubble technology	
TC 282	Water reuse	
PC 283	Project committee: Occupational health and safety management systems - Requirements	
PC 284	Project committee: Management System for Quality of Private Security Company (PSC) Operations - Requirements with Guidance	Merged into TC 292
TC 285	Clean cookstoves and clean cooking solutions	
PC 286	Project committee: Collaborative business relationship management	
PC 287	Project committee: Chain of custody of wood and wood-based products	
PC 288	Project committee: Educational organizations management systems - Requirements with guidance for use	Disbanded
TC 289	Brand evaluation	
TC 290	Online reputation	STANDBY
TC 291	Domestic gas cooking appliances	
TC 292	Security and resilience	
TC 293	Feed machinery	
PC 294	Project committee: Guidance on unit pricing	Disbanded
PC 295	Project committee: Audit data collection	
TC 296	Bamboo and rattan	
TC 297	Waste management, recycling and road operation service	
TC 298	Rare earth	
TC 299	Robots and robotic devices	
TC 300	Solid Recovered Fuels	
TC 301	Energy management and energy saving	
PC 302	Project committee: Guidelines for auditing management systems	
PC 303	Project committee: Guidelines on consumer warranties and guarantees	Disbanded
TC 304	Healthcare organization management	
PC 305	Project committee: Sustainable non-sewered sanitation systems	
TC 306	Foundry machinery	
TC 307	Blockchain and distributed ledger technologies	
PC 308	Project committee: Chain of custody	
TC 309	Governance of organizations	
TC 310	Wheeled child conveyances	
TC 311	Vulnerable consumers	Disbanded
TC 312	Excellence in service	
TC 313	Packaging machinery	
TC 314	Ageing societies	
TC 315	Cold chain logistics	
PC 316	Project committee: Water efficient products - Rating	
PC 317	Project committee: Consumer protection: privacy by design for consumer goods and services	
PC 318	Project committee: Community scale resource oriented sanitation treatment systems	Disbanded
TC 319	Karst	
PC 320	Project committee: Tableware, giftware, jewellery, luminaries - Glass clarity - Classification and test method	Disbanded
TC 321	Transaction assurance in E-commerce	
TC 322	Sustainable finance	
TC 323	Circular economy	
TC 324	Sharing economy	
PC 325	Project committee: Sex toys - Design and safety requirements for products in direct contact with genitalia, the anus, or both	Disbanded
TC 326	Machinery intended for use with foodstuffs	
TC 327	Natural stones	
TC 328	Engineered stones	
PC 329	Project committee: Consumer incident investigation guideline	
TC 330	Surfaces with biocidal and antimicrobial properties	
TC 331	Biodiversity	
TC 332	Security equipment for financial institutions and commercial organizations	
TC 333	Lithium	
TC 334	Reference materials	
PC 335	Project committee: Guidelines for organizations to increase consumer understanding of online terms and conditions	
TC 336	Laboratory design	
PC 337	Project committee: Guidelines for the promotion and implementation of gender equality	
TC 338	Menstrual products	
TC 339	Small hydropower plants (SHP plants)	
TC 340	Natural gas fuelling stations	
TC 341	Heat supply network	
TC 342	Management consultancy	
PC 343	Project committee: Management System for UN Sustainable development goals – Requirements for any organization	
TC 344	Innovative logistics	
TC 345	Specialty metals and minerals	
TC 346	Mechanical energy storage technology	
TC 347	Data-driven agrifood systems	
PC 348	Project committee: Sustainable raw materials	
TC 349	Cultural heritage conservation	
WS ESG	Framework for implementing environment, social and governance (ESG) principles	

== Other bodies developing standards or guides ==
- CIE - International Commission on Illumination
- IIW - International Institute of Welding
- ISO/CASCO - Committee on conformity assessment
- ISO/COPOLCO - Committee on consumer policy
- ISO/REMCO - Committee on reference materials
- ISO/TMBG - Technical Management Board - groups
- IULTCS - International Union of Leather Technologists and Chemists Societies

== See also ==
- List of IEC technical committees
- List of ISO standards
- List of IEC standards
- List of EN standards
- International Classification for Standards
- Standardization
