= Interface =

Interface or interfacing may refer to:

== Academic journals ==
- Interface (journal), by the Electrochemical Society
- Interface, Journal of Applied Linguistics, now merged with ITL International Journal of Applied Linguistics
- Interface: A Journal for and About Social Movements
- Interface, shortened name for the Journal of the Royal Society Interface, covering the interface between life sciences and physical sciences
- Interfaces (journal), now INFORMS Journal on Applied Analytics

== Arts and entertainment ==
- Interface (album), by Dominion, 1996
- Interface (band), an American music group
- Interface (film), a 1984 American film
- Interface (novel), by Stephen Bury (a pseudonym), 1994
- "Interface" (Star Trek: The Next Generation), an episode of the TV series
- Interface series, a science fiction horror story in short installments on Reddit

== Science and technology ==
- Interface (computing), a shared boundary between system components
  - Interface (Java)
  - Interface (object-oriented programming)
  - Application binary interface, between two binary program modules
  - Application programming interface, between a client and a server
  - Network interface, between two pieces of equipment or protocol layers in a computer network
  - User interface, between humans and machines
    - Graphical user interface
- Audio and video interfaces and connectors
- Interface (communication studies), in the work environment
- Interface (matter), in the physical sciences
- Biointerface, in inorganic and organic material
- Business interoperability interface, between organizational systems
- Social interface, a concept in social science

== Other ==
- Interface, Inc., a flooring manufacturer
- Interface:2010, or Interface, an international-standard-setting body in marketing
- Interfacing, a textile used on the unseen side of fabrics for rigidity

== See also ==
- Boundary (disambiguation)
- Interface area, where segregated nationalist and unionist areas meet in Northern Ireland
