= Interface control document =

Technical document in systems engineering

An interface control document, commonly identified by the acronym ICD, is a technical document used to record, define and control interface information between systems, subsystems, equipment, hardware components or software components.

In systems engineering, an interface can be understood as a shared boundary between functional units, defined by characteristics related to functions, physical exchanges of signals and other technical attributes. The control of such interfaces is relevant in projects in which different parts of a system need to be developed, integrated, tested and maintained in a compatible way.

An ICD is used mainly in contexts where the integration of technical elements requires a precise definition of shared information. This information may include signals, messages, data formats, communication protocols, physical characteristics, compatibility requirements and responsibilities between the parties involved. For this reason, this type of document is associated with integration, verification, validation, configuration management and change control activities in engineering projects.

== Description and purpose ==
An interface control document records, in a controlled manner, the information needed for interconnected elements of a system to remain compatible with each other. It works as a common reference for teams involved in development, integration, verification, validation, maintenance and change control, reducing ambiguities that may arise when separately developed parts of a system need to exchange data, signals or physical information with each other.

The main purpose of an ICD is to establish a shared description of the interface. This description allows different teams to understand how the elements of the system must communicate or connect, which information must be exchanged, which constraints must be respected and which technical parameters must remain compatible. In complex projects, this function is relevant because different parts of the system may be designed by different teams, organizations or suppliers.

NASA describes interface control documentation as documentation that identifies and captures interface information and approved change requests, citing the Interface Control Document or Interface Control Drawing among the types of documentation used in interface management. In technical programs such as the Global Positioning System, interface control documents are described as formal means to establish, define and control interfaces, documenting detailed interface design information.

== Typical content ==
The content of an ICD varies according to the application domain, the engineering process adopted and the complexity of the project. In general, it may include:

- identification of the interface;
- systems, subsystems or components involved;
- input and output signals;
- messages exchanged between systems;
- data types, units of measurement, scales, limits and tolerances;
- transmission periodicity or frequency;
- communication protocols and message formats;
- connectors and physical characteristics;
- diagrams, drawings and tables;
- technical responsibilities between the parties involved;
- change history.

The Defense Logistics Agency describes the ICD as a record of the interface information generated for a project, including drawings, diagrams, tables and textual information.

In digital interfaces, the document may describe message fields, data encoding, transmission order, update rate, valid values, possible states and error conditions. In physical or electromechanical interfaces, it may record connectors, dimensions, electrical signals, power supply characteristics, mechanical constraints and environmental conditions relevant to compatibility between the connected elements. The exact content depends on the type of system and the practices adopted by the organization responsible for the project.

== Types of documented interfaces ==
An interface control document may cover different types of interfaces, depending on the nature of the system and the application domain. In systems engineering, interfaces may involve physical, electrical, mechanical, human, functional or communication aspects.

Among the types of interfaces that may be documented in an ICD are:

- physical interfaces, such as connectors, dimensions, mounting points or mechanical characteristics;
- electrical interfaces, such as voltage levels, currents, discrete signals or power supply characteristics;
- data interfaces, such as messages, fields, data types, units and encoding formats;
- communication interfaces, such as protocols, buses, transmission frequency and message exchange rules;
- hardware-software interfaces, when software functions depend on signals, registers, sensors or actuators;
- human-machine interfaces, when there is interaction between operators, users or technical teams and the system.

A clear definition of these elements helps reduce divergent interpretations between the parties involved in system development, integration and testing.

== Relationship with interface management ==
The interface control document is associated with interface management, a systems engineering activity aimed at defining, documenting, controlling and maintaining the interfaces between elements of a system. According to NASA, interface management involves defining interfaces, identifying physical, electrical, mechanical and human characteristics, verifying compatibility and controlling interfaces throughout the project.

Interface control documentation may also be related to configuration management processes, since NASA indicates that these outputs are maintained and approved through the configuration management process and become part of the project technical data package.

In the context of interface management, the ICD contributes to maintaining traceability between requirements, design, integration and testing. When an interface is changed, the document may serve as a basis for identifying which systems, subsystems, messages, signals or requirements may be affected. This relationship with configuration control is especially relevant in projects in which changing one interface parameter may affect several parts of the system.

== Change control ==
Change control is an important part of the use of interface control documents. Once an interface has been defined and approved, changes to its parameters may affect other connected systems, subsystems or components. For this reason, changes to interfaces often require impact analysis, approval and update of the corresponding documentation.

NASA indicates that interface documentation must be maintained and approved through configuration management processes, becoming part of the project technical data package. In this sense, an ICD does not function only as an initial description of the interface, but also as a controlled record of approved changes throughout the system life cycle.

Changes to an interface may involve, for example, modifications to message format, unit of measurement, data type, transmission frequency, connector, communication protocol or operating limit. Without proper control, such changes may cause incompatibilities during integration, testing, operation or maintenance.

== Relationship with integration, verification and validation ==
Systems engineering process related to requirements, integration, verification and validation.

In complex projects, the ICD may serve as a reference during system integration, verification and validation and change impact analysis. NASA indicates that interface information and approved changes may serve as input to verification and validation processes, especially when interface parameters are needed to define test objectives and test plans.

This relationship is relevant because a system may work correctly in isolation but present failures when integrated with other systems. Interface control helps verify whether the connected parts follow the same technical definitions.

During integration, the ICD may be used to compare the actual behavior of an interface with the documented definition. In testing, it may help identify expected parameters, input and output formats, acceptable limits, operating conditions and compatibility criteria. Therefore, the document may support both test preparation and the analysis of failures found during integration.

== Related documents ==
The terminology and division between interface documents vary according to the organization, sector and process adopted. Related documents include:

- IRD — Interface Requirements Document;
- ICD — Interface Control Document or Interface Control Drawing;
- IDD — Interface Definition Document;
- ICP — Interface Control Plan.

These documents are cited by NASA as types of documentation related to interface management.

In general, interface requirements documents tend to record needs and constraints that an interface must satisfy, while interface definition or control documents describe the adopted technical solution and the data needed for its implementation and verification. This distinction may vary according to the engineering process used.

== Applications ==
Interface control documents are used in areas involving integration between systems or components developed separately. These areas include:

- systems engineering;
- software engineering;
- integration between hardware and software;
- aerospace systems;
- systems of systems.

In software and hardware systems, the ICD may support the documentation of interfaces between components that exchange data, signals or messages. In aerospace systems, it may be used to record interfaces between equipment, electronic subsystems, onboard computers, payloads, ground stations or other technical elements.

In systems of systems, the management of interface control documents appears in the academic literature as an activity associated with the integration between different constituent systems.

== Digital documentation ==
In complex projects, interface control documents may be maintained in digital formats, databases, systems engineering tools, requirements management environments or version-controlled repositories. The purpose is to facilitate traceability, review, version control and consistency between interface data and other technical artifacts of the project.

In the literature on systems of systems, interface control document management has been related to documentation as code approaches, in which technical documentation is treated similarly to source code, with versioning, review and automated validation. This approach may help maintain the consistency of interfaces in projects involving multiple systems, teams or organizations.

== See also ==
- Systems engineering
- System integration
- Software engineering
- Configuration management
- Verification and validation
