= IMSI =

IMSI may refer to:

- International mobile subscriber identity
- Intracytoplasmic morphologically selected sperm injection
- Interface Marketing Supplier Integration Institute, standards organization
- Idaho Maximum Security Institution, prison
- International Maple Syrup Institute, see maple syrup
