= ISO 20671 =

ISO 20671 Brand evaluation - Principles and fundamentals, renumbered ISO 20671-1 in November 2021, is an international standard issued by the International Organization for Standardization that provides guidance to organizations, regardless of their activity or size, on the evaluation of brands.

This standard was developed by the ISO/TC 289 committee.

== History ==
The standard was developed by the ISO/TC 289 committee, which started the project in May 2016, finishing it during the ISO/TC 289 Plenary Meeting held in Milan at the UNI headquarter from 11 to 13 June 2018.

The first edition of ISO 20671 was published in March 2019. in November 2021 the international standard has been renumbered in ISO 20671-1.

AS International, headquartered in Vienna, have certified so far several brand evaluation agencies to ISO 20671 via its mandated ISO auditing entity.

== Main requirements of the standard ==
The ISO 20671-1:2021 standard adopts the structure with the following breakdown:

- 1 Purpose
- 2 Normative references
- 3 Terms and definitions
- 4 Principles of conducting a brand evaluation
  - 4.1 General principles
  - 4.2 Transparency
  - 4.3 Consistency
  - 4.4 Objectivity
- 5 Fundamentals of brand evaluation
  - 5.1 General
  - 5.2 Elements
    - 5.2.1 General
    - 5.2.2 Tangible elements
    - 5.2.3 Quality elements
    - 5.2.4 Elements of innovation
    - 5.2.5 Service elements
    - 5.2.6 Intangible assets
  - 5.3 Dimensions
    - 5.3.1 Legal size
    - 5.3.2 Customer / other stakeholder size
    - 5.3.3 Market size
    - 5.3.4 Size of the economic and political environment
    - 5.3.5 Financial dimension
- 6 Considerations on brand evaluation
  - 6.1 Staff
  - 6.2 Practices and processes
  - 6.3 Brand evaluation audit
  - 6.4 Data sourcing
  - 6.5 Results of brand evaluation
- Annex A (informative) Examples of indicators for elements and dimensions
- Bibliography

== Version history ==
Year	Description
2019	ISO 20671 (1st Edition)
2021	ISO 20671-1 (1st Edition renumbered)

== See also ==
- ISO 10668
- ISO/TC 289
- List of ISO standards
- International Organization for Standardization
- Branding
- Brand management
