= ASC X9 =

American financial standards industry group

Accredited Standards Committee X9 Financial Industry Standards
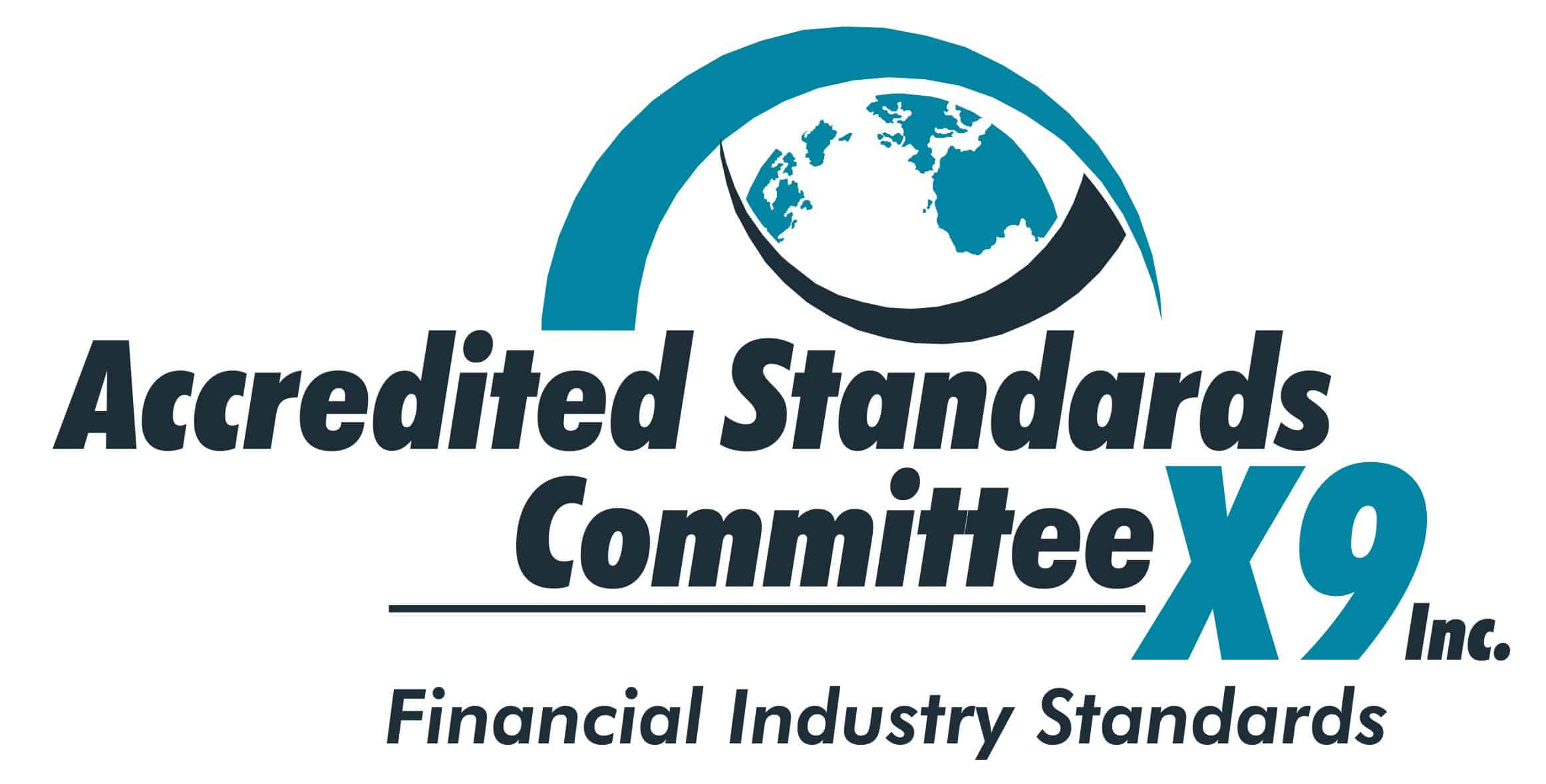
- Abbreviation: ASC X9
- Formation: 1974; 52 years ago
- Type: Standards setting group
- Purpose: Develop standards for the Financial Services Industry
- Headquarters: Annapolis, Maryland United States
- Official language: English
- Chair: Roy DeCicco
- Vice Chair: Angela Hendershott
- Executive Director: Steve Stevens
- Program Manager: Janet Busch
- Affiliations: Accredited by ANSI Secretariat for ISO/TC 68
- Website: x9.org

The Accredited Standards Committee X9 (ASC X9, Inc.) is an ANSI (American National Standards Institute) accredited standards developing organization, responsible for developing voluntary open consensus standards for the financial services industry in the U.S.

ASC X9 is the USA Technical Advisory Group (TAG) to the International Technical Committee on Financial Services ISO/TC 68 under the International Organization for Standardization (ISO), of Geneva, Switzerland, and submits X9 American National Standards to the international committee to be considered for adoption as international standards or ISO standards. Membership in ASC X9 is open to all U.S. domiciled companies and organizations in the financial services industry.

== History ==
The committee was founded in 1974 under the American National Standards Institute, to develop financial industry standards following a surge in electronic banking, automated clearing, and data security needs.

In 1984 it played a major role role in supporting the Check Clearing for the 21st Century Act (Check 21) through development of check image exchange and related standards.

In the 1990s it expanded its cryptography standards, developing foundational specifications for secure data exchange and public key infrastructures (e.g., X9.42, X9.73, X9.24).

In 2001, the organization was incorporated as ASC X9, Inc., transitioning from a pure ANSI committee to a non-profit industry consortium still accredited by ANSI.

During the 2000s and 2010s it joined with international bodies like ISO/TC 68, helping shape ISO 20022 and other global standards for payments and securities messaging.

== Domestic Role ==
The Accredited Standards Committee X9 develops, establishes, maintains, and promotes standards for the Financial Services Industry in the United States in order to facilitate delivery of financial services and products.

== Committees ==
ASC X9 is composed of five Subcommittees based on Financial Services business sectors:

- X9A – Retail Payments (including mobile payments and a card not present fraud group);
- X9B – Checks and Back-office Operations (all things related to checks);
- X9C – Corporate Banking (B2B payments and the Balance Transaction Reporting Standard (BTRS) standard);
- X9D – Securities (stocks and bonds, CUSIP); and
- X9F – Data & Information Security (methods and cryptography to secure financial data).

== Standards ==
Examples of X9 standards commonly used today in the US and around the world are:

- Paper and electronic check standards (X9 owns nearly 98% of the standardized real estate on the front and back of checks, the magnetic ink character record was originally developed by X9, the credit and debit card transactions standard operating all card transactions first developed under X9
- Numerous data security standards for financial services including the "PIN" - personal identification standard in wide use today.
- Data Encryption Standard (DES) and its successor Triple DES the current encryption security algorithm used in securing most banking transactions worldwide.
