= Eugen Wüster =

Industrialist and terminologist

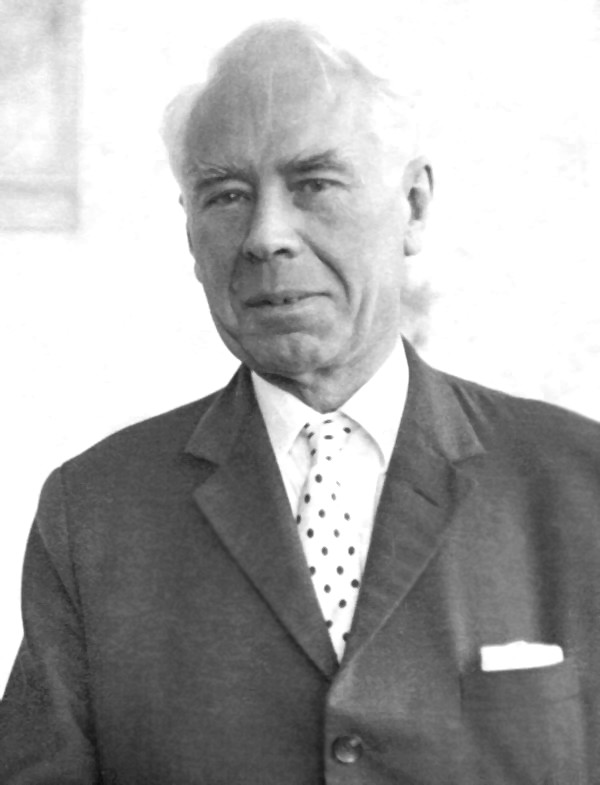
- Eugen Wüster in 1967
- Born: Eugen Bernhard Casper Wüster; 10 October 1898; Wieselburg, Austria
- Died: 29 March 1977 (aged 78); Vienna, Austria
- Occupation(s): electrical engineer industrialist terminologist

Eugen Wüster (10 October 1898 – 29 March 1977) was an industrialist and terminologist, regarded as "the father of technological standardization".

== Career ==
Wüster became enthusiastic about Esperanto when he was 15, soon becoming an Esperanto translator and author, particularly about questions of Esperanto terminology and lexicography. He trained in electrical engineering and later took over his father's factory. From mid-1918 to 1920, as a student, he compiled the encyclopedic Esperanto-German dictionary. Wüster used the experience gained in compiling this dictionary to aid the writing of his Stuttgart thesis.

As a result of his work on international technical communication, the Technical Committee for Terminology Standardization of the International Organization for Standardization (ISO/TC 37) was established in 1936. Wüster coined many of the international principles of terminology standardization and contributed to the foundations of the modern information society. The influence of Wüster's ideas has been prominent especially in the medical field, where it has also given rise to a critical reaction.

He taught at the University of Vienna. The Eugen-Wüster Archives at the University of Vienna as well as at the Esperanto Museum and Department of Planned Languages of the Austrian National Library are based on material that he bequeathed. The Eugene Wüster Prize for outstanding achievements in the field of terminological research has been established under the sponsorship of the Vienna University and the City of Vienna.

== Terminology ==
Wüster collaborated in the compilation and publishing of the first edition of the International Electrotechnical Vocabulary, London 1938.

He also worked on problems of bibliography, on reform of German orthography, on the Universal Decimal Classification system, on problems in informatics. Wüster also wrote a dictionary about mechanical tools, the latest version of which is available online. In 1971 Wüster initiated the founding of Infoterm, which he pro-actively supported until his death. He left many unpublished manuscripts on various subjects.

== Publications (selection) ==
- Internationale Sprachnormung in der Technik, besonders in der Elektrotechnik (International Language standardization in technology, particularly in electrical engineering.'). (Die nationale Sprachnormung und ihre Verallgemeinerung) (The national language standardization and generalization). Berlin: VDJ 1931. 2nd edition. Bonn: Bouvier 1966
- Die Herstellung der Sägeblätter für Holz. Eine Betriebsführung für Sägewerker und andere Sägenfachleute (The production of saw blades for wood. An operational guide for saw mills and other cutting specialists). Springer, Wien 1952
- Bibliography of monolingual scientific and technical glossaries, 2nd edition, Unesco, Paris 1955, 1959
- Einführung in die allgemeine Terminologielehre und terminologische Lexikographie (the general introduction to terminology and terminological lexicography lesson). 3rd Edition, Romanistischer Verlag, Bonn 1991, ISBN 3-924888-48-5
- International bibliography of standardized vocabularies. Bibliographie internationale de vocabulaires normalisés. (International Bibliography of the standard dictionaries.) Initiated by Eugene Wüster. Prepared by Helmut Felber [et al.]. 2nd ed / Wüster, Eugen / Saur, München 1979
- Wüster, Thiele (1998). "100 Jahre Wüster & Co., Wieselburg, 1889-1989 (Auszüge)". Eugen Wüster (1898-1977). Leben und Werk, Ein österreichischer Pionier der Informationsgesellschaft. Proceedings of the International Conference on Professional Communication and Knowledge Transfer, Volume 1 (in German). Vienna: TermNet. pp. 207–234. ISBN 3-901010-20-3.
- Wüster, Eugen (1973). "Benennungs- und Wörterbuchgrundsätze, Ihre Anfänge in Deutschland". Muttersprache, Zeitschrift zur Pflege und Erforschung der deutschen Sprache (in German) (1 Y 4146 F).
- Wüster, Eugen (1924). Die Verhältniswörter des Esperanto. Zugleich eine allgemeine Funktionslehre der Verhältniswörter seiner Quellsprachen (in German). Berlin und Dresden: Esperanto-Verlag Ellersiek & Borel G. m. b. H.
- Wüster, Eugen (1923). Enciklopedia vortaro Esperanta-germana (in Esperanto). Leipzig: Ferdinand Hirt & Sohn.
- Wüster, Eugen (1924). Esperanto und der Techniker. Die Bedeutung der Welthilfssprache Esperanto für den Techniker, ihr Wesen und ihre Ausbreitung seit dem Weltkriege (in German) (2. Auflage ed.). Berlin und Dresden: Esperanto-Verlag Ellersiek & Borel G. m. b. H.
- Wüster, Eugen (1967). Grundbegriffe bei Werkzeugmaschinen (in German) (1. Auflage ed.). London: Technical Press/Economic Commission for Europe of the United Nations.
- Wüster, Eugen (1923). La oficiala radikaro kun enkonduko kaj notoj (in Esperanto). Berlin kaj Dresden: Esperanto-Verlag Ellersiek & Borel G. m. b. H.
- Wüster, Eugen (1923). Maŝinfaka Esperanto-Vortaro prielementa (in Esperanto). Leipzig: Ferdinand Hirt & Sohn.

=== Translations ===
- (in English) Introduction to the General Theory of Terminology and Terminological Lexicography. Springer, Wien 1979
- (in French) Introduction à la théorie générale de la terminologie et à la lexicographie terminologique. Girsterm, Université Laval, Quebec 1979
- (in Spanish) Introducción a la teoría general de la terminología y a la lexicografía terminológica. Institut Universitari de Lingüística Aplicada (IULA), Universität Pompeu Fabra, Barcelona 1998, ISBN 84-477-0648-6 (2nd edition 2003)
