= Wüster =

Wüster is a German language habitational surname. Notable people with the name include:

- Eugen Wüster (1898–1977), Austrian scientist
- Wolfgang Wüster (1964), British zoologist
