= Interactivity =

Interaction between users and computers

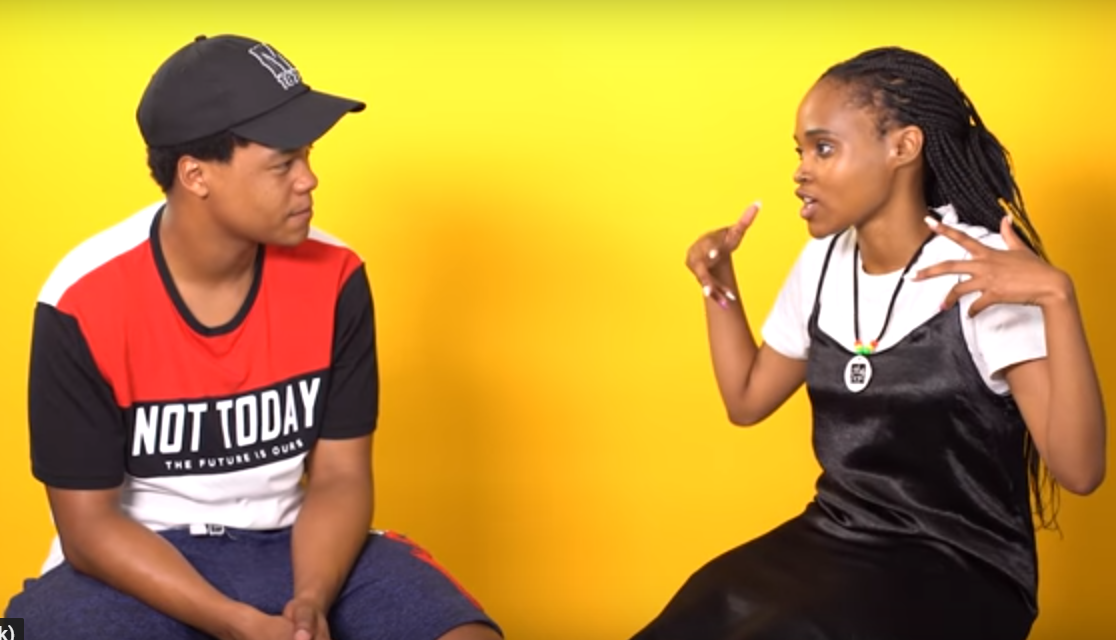
Human interactivity

Across the many fields concerned with interactivity, including information science, computer science, human-computer interaction, communication, and industrial design, there is little agreement over the meaning of the term "interactivity". However, most definitions are related to interaction between users and computers and other machines through a user interface. Interactivity can however also refer to interaction between people. It nevertheless usually refers to interaction between people and computers – and sometimes to interaction between computers – through software, hardware, and networks.

Multiple views on interactivity exist. In the "contingency view" of interactivity, there are three levels:

1. Not interactive, when a message is not related to previous messages.
2. Reactive, when a message is related only to one immediately previous message.
3. Interactive, when a message is related to a number of previous messages and to the relationship between them.

One body of research has made a strong distinction between interaction and interactivity. As the suffix 'ity' is used to form nouns that denote a quality or condition, this body of research has defined interactivity as the 'quality or condition of interaction'. These researchers suggest that the distinction between interaction and interactivity is important since interaction may be present in any given setting, but the quality of the interaction varies from low and high.

== Human to human communication ==
Human communication is the basic example of interactive communication which involves two different processes; human to human interactivity and human to computer interactivity. Human-Human interactivity is the communication between people. The word interactivity is related to and stems from the term interaction used by sociologists, which is the actions of at least two individuals who exchange or interplay. It requires levels of messages that respond to previous messages. Interactivity also refers to a communication systems ability to "talk back".

On the other hand, human to computer communication is the way that people communicate with new media. According to Rada Roy, the "Human Computer interaction model might consists of 4 main components which consist of human, computer, task environment and machine environment. The two basic flows of information and control are assumed. The communication between people and computers; one must understand something about both and about the tasks which people perform with computers. A general model of human - computer interface emphasizes the flow of information and control at the human computer interface." Human to Human interactivity consists of many conceptualizations which are based on anthropomorphic definitions. For example, complex systems that detect and react to human behavior are sometimes called interactive. Under this perspective, interaction includes responses to human physical manipulation like movement, body language, and/or changes in mental states.

== Human to artifact communication ==
In the context of communication between a human and an artifact, interactivity refers to the artifact's interactive behaviour as experienced by the human user. This is different from other aspects of the artifact such as its visual appearance, its internal working, and the meaning of the signs it might mediate. For example, the interactivity of an iPod is not its physical shape and colour (its so-called "design"), its ability to play music, or its storage capacity—it is the behaviour of its user interface as experienced by its user. This includes the way the user moves their finger on its input wheel, the way this allows the selection of a tune in the playlist, and the way the user controls the volume.

An artifact's interactivity is best perceived through use. A bystander can imagine how it would be like to use an artifact by watching others use it, but it is only through actual use that its interactivity is fully experienced and "felt". This is due to the kinesthetic nature of the interactive experience. It is similar to the difference between watching someone drive a car and actually driving it. It is only through the driving that one can experience and "feel" how this car differs from others.

New Media academic Vincent Maher defines interactivity as "the relation constituted by a symbolic interface between its referential, objective functionality and the subject."

== Computing science ==
The term "look and feel" is often used to refer to the specifics of a computer system's user interface. Using this metaphor, the "look" refers to its visual design, while the "feel" refers to its interactivity. Indirectly this can be regarded as an informal definition of interactivity.

For a more detailed discussion of how interactivity has been conceptualized in the human-computer interaction literature, and how the phenomenology of the French philosopher Merleau-Ponty can shed light on the user experience, see (Svanaes 2000).

An IBM study in the early 1980s found that productivity on a computer is highest when the graphical screen updates in one half second or faster; between one half second to three quarters of one second, productivity greatly decreases. In computer science, interactive refers to software which accepts and responds to input from people—for example, data or commands. Interactive software includes most popular programs, such as word processors or spreadsheet applications. By comparison, noninteractive programs operate without human contact; examples of these include compilers and batch processing applications. If the response is complex enough it is said that the system is conducting social interaction and some systems try to achieve this through the implementation of social interfaces.

== Creating interactivity ==
Web interactivity refers to interactive features that are embedded on websites that offer an exchange of information either between communication technology and users or between users using technology. This type of interactivity evolves with new developments of website interfaces. Some interactive features include hyperlinks, feedback, and multimedia displays. Wikipedia is also an example of web interactivity because it is written in a collaborative way. Interactivity in new media distinguishes itself from old media by implementing participation from users rather than passive consumption.

Web page authors can integrate JavaScript coding to create interactive web pages. Sliders, date pickers, drag and dropping are just some of the many enhancements that can be provided.

Various authoring tools are available for creating various kinds of interactivities. Some common platforms for creating interactivities include Adobe XD, Figma and Sketch (software).

eLearning makes use of a concept called an interaction model. Using an interaction model, any person can create interactivities in a very short period of time. Some of the interaction models presented with authoring tools fall under various categories like games, puzzles, simulation tools, presentation tools, etc., which can be completely customized.

== See also ==
- Haptic (disambiguation)
- Happening
- Human factors
- Digital Marketing
- Interaction
- Interactive art
- Interactive computing
- Interactive media
- Interactive music
- Interaction design
- Sonic interaction design
- Interaction Model
- Virtual reality

== Bibliography ==
- Liu, Yuping and L. J. Shrum (2002), "What is Interactivity and is it Always Such a Good Thing? Implications of Definition, Person, and Situation for the Influence of Interactivity on Advertising Effectiveness," Journal of Advertising, 31 (4), p. 53-64. Available at Yupingliu.com
- Rafaeli, S. (1988). `Interactivity: From new media to communication. In R. P. Hawkins, J. M. Wiemann, & S. Pingree (Eds.), Sage Annual Review of Communication Research: Advancing Communication Science: Merging Mass and Interpersonal Processes, 16, 110–134. Beverly Hills: Sage. Haifa.ac.il.
- Svanaes, D. (2000). Understanding Interactivity: Steps to a Phenomenology of Human-Computer Interaction. NTNU, Trondheim, Norway. PhD, NTNU.no
- Frank Popper, Art—Action and Participation, New York University Press, 1975
