= Projector camera systems =

System that takes photos

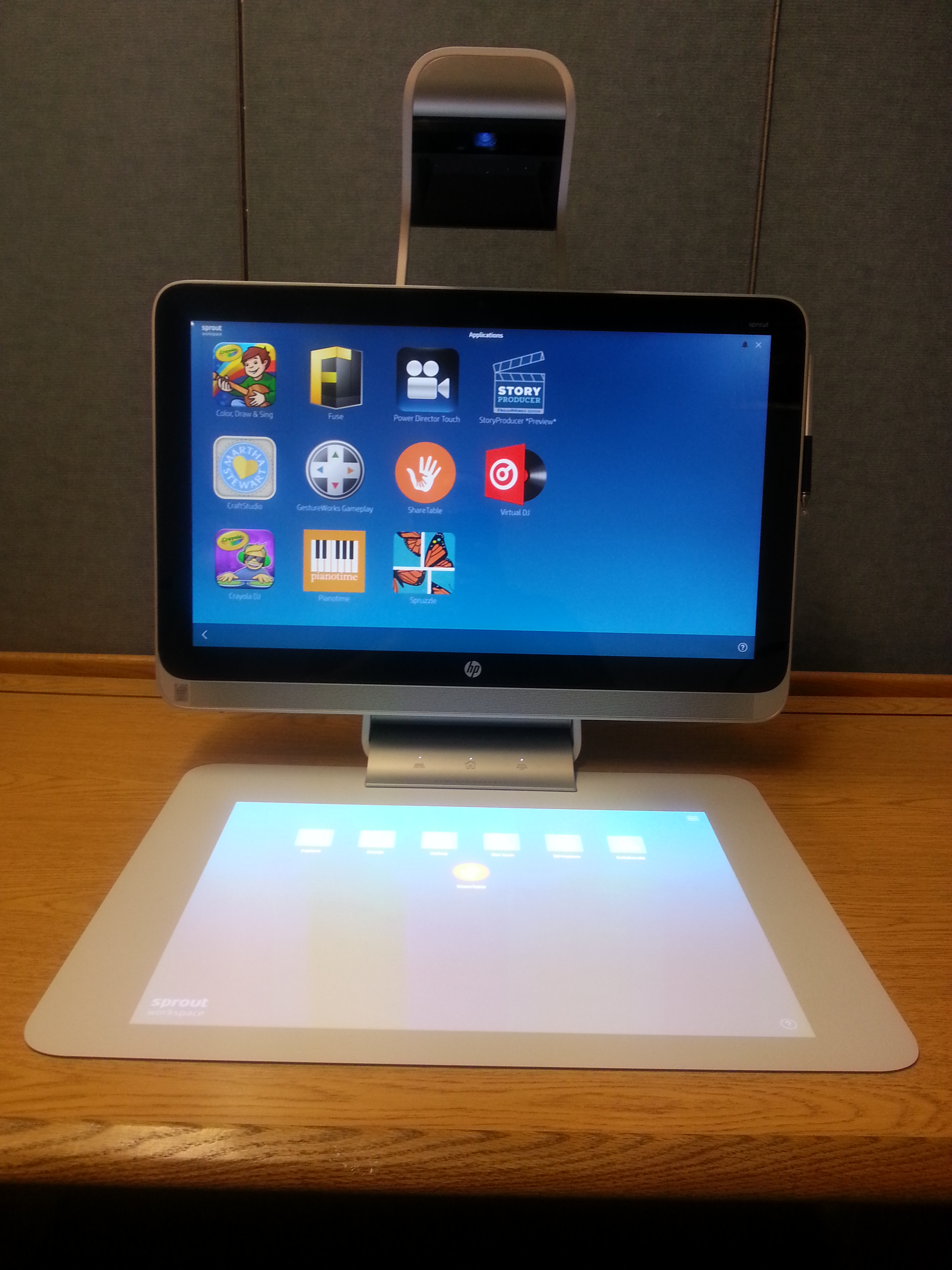
Hp Sprout

Projector-camera systems (pro-cam), also called camera-projector systems, augment a local surface with a projected captured image of a remote surface, creating a shared workspace for remote collaboration and communication. Projector-camera systems may also be used for artistic and entertainment purposes. A pro-cam system consists of a vertical screen for implementing interpersonal space where front-facing videos are displayed, and a horizontal projected screen on the tabletop for implementing shared workspace where downward facing videos are overlapped. An automatically pre-warped image is sent to the projector to ensure that the horizontal screen appears undistorted.

== Examples ==
Pro-cam systems create a shared workspace between users with overlapping video technique which was invented by the researcher John Tang in Xerox PARC, 1991.

Digital Desk and Double Digital Desk was the first prototypes of pro-cam systems developed by Xerox Research Center Europe.

ShareTable was the first prototype which is deployed in the field and tested with real users created by Lana Yarosh et al. at 2009.

Microsoft Research has introduced the IllumiShare system which was an application of pro-cam systems at 2012.

HP Inc. created a consumer pro-cam product named Sprout and released to market at the end of 2014.
