= Orismology =

Scientific field

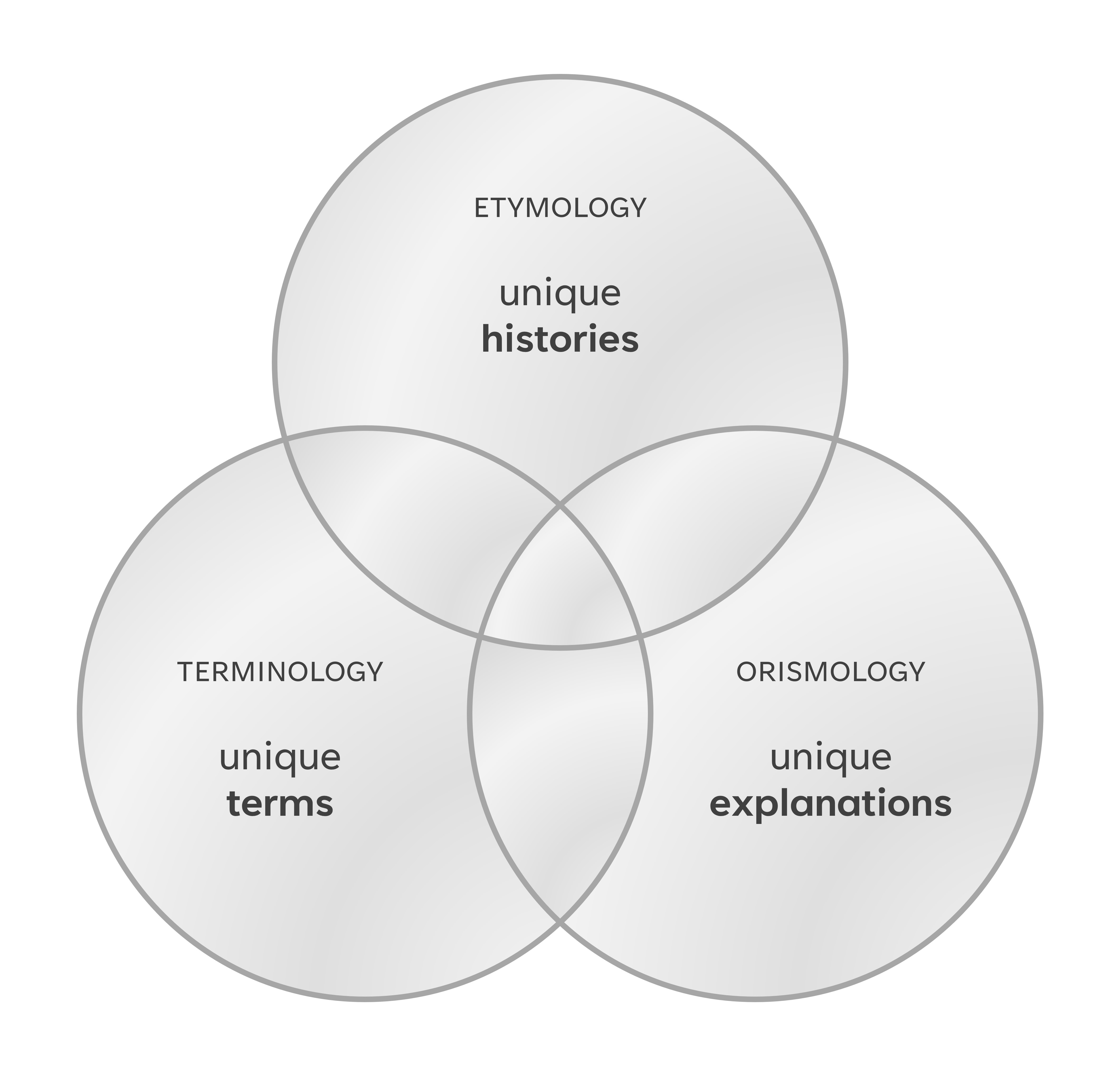
Venn diagram showing the relationship between etymology, terminology, and orismology

Orismology (/ˌɒrəzˈmɑːlədʒi/ or-əz-MAWL-ə-jee) is either a collection of terminological explanations or the science of defining technical terms. Orismology is particularly applicable to the analysis and the writing of stipulative, normative definitions that explain and delimit the use of technical terms. The word is constructed from the Greek ὁρῐσμός horismós ('definition', lit. 'marking boundaries') and λόγος lógos ('speech, study').

== Etymology ==
The word was coined by William Kirby and William Spence in their Introduction to Entomology in the early 1800s: "XLVL—Orismology, or explanation of terms [...]." This approach to definition is particularly applied to disciplines in natural sciences like Kirby and Spence's entomology that depend upon classificatory schemes, such as taxonomies and ontologies, to organize, name, and address their subject matter.

Since the emergence of the discipline of terminology, the use of orismology has been specialized to definitions and returned to its Greek roots, in the words horismos, "definition" (from horizein, "to define") and logos, "reason, study".

In the construction of glossaries, that is, specialized dictionaries within a specified domain of discourse, orismology is generally taken as the complement of nomenography, the study of terms necessary and sufficient for discourse within a specified domain.

== Orismology ==
Merriam-Webster (2024) stated that orismology is "the science of defining technical terms".

The Oxford English Dictionary (1909) reported that orismology means "[a] name for the explanation of technical terms, or for such terms collectively; terminology."

The Imperial Dictionary (1882) reported that orismology is "that branch of natural history which relates to the explanation of the technical terms of the science."

=== Etymology and terminology ===
In Elk's view, orismology includes etymology and should not be confused with terminology, which focuses on current and immediate interpretations of words. He gives this example: The drug name penicillin was coined by Alexander Fleming from the Latin for paintbrush, which is penicillus. Methicillin, a type of penicillin, gained its name by attaching the stem -cillin (from the United States Adopted Names Council's list of stems) to a prefix meth which has no inherent meaning. The study of penicillin and methicillin individually would be an etymological study of terminology. However, the study of methicillin as its name derived from penicillin historically might best be described, according to Elk, as orismologic. Elk's use of the words orismology and terminology echo the historical notions of Kirby and Spence rather than modern disciplinary senses of these words.

=== Nomenography ===
Orismology does not entail etymology, but nomenography may well delve into etymological analysis to construct such neologisms as are needed to satisfy logical requirements for terms within a domain of discourse. Orismology and nomenography are studies overlapping both terminology and specialized lexicography.
