= ISO/TC 289 =

ISO/TC 289 Brand evaluation is Technical Committee n.289 of the International Organization for Standardization (ISO) formed in 2014 to develop standards in the area of Brand evaluation.

== History ==
In January 2014 the Technical management Board of ISO (TMB) took the decision to create a new ISO Technical committee called ISO/TC 289. The first plenary meeting was held on 2014 September 25–26 in Beijing, hosted by Standardization Administration of China (SAC) and China Council for Brand Development (CCBD). The first meeting of ISO/TC 289/WG1 was held by China Council for Brand Development in Shenzhen (China), from November 11 to 12, 2015.

The first meeting of ISO/TC 289/WG2 was held by UNI (Italian Standardization Body) in Rome (Italy), from January 21 to 23, 2019.

== Scope ==
The current scope of ISO/TC 289 primarily focuses on standardization in the field of brand evaluation. The main activity of ISO/TC 289 is to develop international standards supporting the international practice of brand evaluation and brand management.

== Leadership and organization ==
- Chair (2014–2021) – Dr.Bobby J.Calder (USA)
- Secretary Ms Lili Lu (China)

ISO/TC 289 currently has the following organisation.

- ISO/TC 289/CAG Chairman's Advisory Group – Convenor (until 2021): Mr.Pingjun Liu (China).
- ISO/TC 289/WG 1: Brand evaluation process – Convenor (until 2020): Mr.Gerhard Hrebiceck (Austria) and Mrs.Fang Wu (China)
- ISO/TC 289/WG 2: Implementation/Guidelines – Convenor (until 2021): Mr.Claudio Barella (Italy).
- ISO/TC 289/TG 1: Communications task group – Convenor (until end of 2019): Mrs.Patricia McQuillan (Canada).
- ISO/TC 289/TG 2: Collecting present concepts and philosophies in the market and developing Terms & Definitions – Convenor (until end of 2020): Zeshi Yang (China) and Edgar Baum (Canada).
- ISO/TC 289/TG 3: ISO 10668 review – Convenor (until 2021): Mr.David Haigh (UK).

ISO/TC 289 has 12 Participating countries and 24 Observer countries.

== Published standards ==
published ISO standards under the direct responsibility of ISO/TC 289:

Brand evaluation

- ISO 10668:2010 Brand valuation — Requirements for monetary brand valuation
- ISO 20671:2019 Brand evaluation – Principles and fundamentals

ISO standards under development with the direct responsibility of ISO/TC 289:

- ISO/AWI 23353 Brand evaluation — Guidelines for brands related to Geographical Indications
- ISO/AWI 24051 Brand evaluation – Guidance for annual brand evaluations.

== See also ==
- List of ISO Technical Committees
- Brand
- Brand management
