= Processing mode =

Types of computer processing

Data processing modes or computing modes are classifications of different types of computer processing.

- Interactive computing or Interactive processing, historically introduced as Time-sharing
- Transaction processing
- Batch processing
- Real-time processing

== See also ==
- Methods of production
