= Interaction model =

In the context of e-learning, interactivity is defined as "the function of input required by the learner while responding to the computer, the analysis of those responses by the computer, and the nature of the action by the computer."

== Variables of interactivity ==
There are two variables describing the interactivity of a given lesson: technology affordance and user freedom. Technology affordance, also known as manual operators, is the richness of the communication between the student and the instructor, usually expressed in terms of the input and output channels. User freedom, on the other hand, is a function of the degree of freedom the learning system grants the student in influencing the presentation of the lesson.

=== Technology affordance ===
Technology affordance in the e-Learning is a function of the capabilities of available computer I/O devices, having a tendency to evolve as new input and output devices become obtainable. There are five levels of technology affordance interactivity:

1. Immersion: full sensory immersion commonly called virtual reality. Video games are the closest approximation we have to immersion today.
2. Text: allowing the student to communicate through arbitrary textual input and output. A Google search box or a discussion board interaction are examples of text level interactivity.
3. Voice: the same as text, except emotion and body language are used as communication channels. A phone conversation is an example of voice level interactivity.
4. Menu select: providing the learner the capability to "select an answer among multiple choice questions [or] pulling down a menu and selecting a menu item". Clicking on a hyperlink in a web page is an example of menu-select interactivity.
5. Toggle select: the ability to "click a button or press a key". A pinball machine, for example, exhibits toggle-select interactivity.
