= Adonit =

Consumer electronics company

- Native name: 煥德科技股份有限公司
- Company type: Private
- Industry: Input Devices and Software
- Founded: 2010
- Headquarters: Austin, Texas, U.S. Taipei, Taiwan
- Key people: Ian Kung; Jasper Li; Zach Zeliff; David Sperry; Kris Perpich
- Products: Styluses, Cases, Software
- Number of employees: 180 worldwide (2014)
- Website: www.adonit.net

Adonit is a privately owned multinational corporation based in Austin, Texas and Taipei, Taiwan. Founded in 2010 with a Kickstarter campaign, the company provides consumer electronics and software, including capacitive styluses, mobile apps and SDKs primarily for the Apple iPad.

In 2012, Adonit launched Jot Touch, its first connected bluetooth stylus with pressure sensitivity. It was regarded as the most precise pressure-sensitive stylus for the iPad. In 2013, Adonit developed Pixelpoint technology to build the first 1.9 mm tip, making it the smallest iOS stylus tip on the market. Jot Script, the first stylus with Pixelpoint technology, was designed to provide a natural handwriting experience for notetakers.
