= ISO/TC 46 =

ISO committee

ISO/TC 46 is Technical Committee 46 of the International Organization for Standardization (ISO), responsible for matters concerning information, indexing and documentation.

The scope of the committee is 'standardization of practices relating to libraries, documentation and information centres, publishing, archives, records management, museum documentation, indexing and abstracting services, and information science'.

== Leadership ==
Since 2022, the Technical Committee Chair is Grégory Miura, from France.

For 2018–2022, the chair was Gaëlle Béquet, from France, who served two term as chairperson (the first was 2014–2017). Françoise Pellé, also French, served as chair from 2008 to 2014.

== Subcommittees ==
Most work of the Technical Committee is done by Subcommittees (SC) dealing with a particular field. The Subcommittees are:

- ISO/TC 46/SC 2: Conversion of written languages (Inactive)
- ISO/TC 46/SC 3: Terminology of information and documentation (Inactive)
- ISO/TC 46/SC 4: Technical interoperability
- ISO/TC 46/SC 5: Monolingual and multilingual thesauri and related indexing practices (Inactive)
- ISO/TC 46/SC 6: Bibliographic data elements in manual and machine systems (Inactive)
- ISO/TC 46/SC 7: Presentation of publications (Inactive)
- ISO/TC 46/SC 8: Quality - Statistics and performance evaluation
- ISO/TC 46/SC 9: Identification and description
- ISO/TC 46/SC 10: Requirements for document storage and conditions for preservation
- ISO/TC 46/SC 11: Archives/records management

== See also ==
- List of ISO Technical Committees
