= ISO/TC 37 =

ISO terminology committee

Language and terminology
- Logo of the ISO/TC 37 meetings in Bogotá, 2009
- Formation: 1947
- Type: Technical Committee of ISO
- Purpose: International standardization related to terminology, translation, interpreting and other language-based activities
- Members: 41 participating members, 24 observer members
- Official languages: English and French
- Website: Official website

ISO/TC 37 is a technical committee within the International Organization for Standardization (ISO) that prepares standards and other documents concerning methodology and principles for terminology and language resources.

ISO/TC 37 is a "horizontal" committee that provides guidelines for other technical committees on how to manage terminological issues. Its standards are not restricted to ISO. The committee collaborates with industry to ensure that the requirements and needs of users of standards concerning terminology, language and structured content are addressed.

Participation in standards development is open to all stakeholders, and requests can be made to the TC through any liaison or member organization. A list of current members and liaisons is available from ISO.

ISO/TC 37 standards are used in internationalization and localization, translation, and other industry applications.

== ISO/TC 37 "Language and terminology" ==
International Standards are developed by experts from industry, academia and business who are delegates of their national standards institution or another organization in liaison. Involvement, therefore, is principally open to all stakeholders. They are based on consensus among those national standards institutes who collaborate in the respective committee by way of membership.

ISO/TC 37 develops International Standards concerning:

- terminological principles and methods
- vocabulary of terminology and language resource management
- terminology work
- preparation and management of language resources
- preparation and layout of terminology standards
- computerized terminography and lexicography
- terminology documentation
- coding and codes in the field of terminology and other language resources
- applications of terminology and other language resources in language engineering and content management
- translation, interpreting and related technology

ISO/TC 37 looks upon a long history of terminology unification activities. In the past, terminology experts - even more so experts of terminology theory and methodology - had to struggle for wide recognition. Today their expertise is sought in many application areas, especially in various fields of standardization. The emerging multilingual information society and knowledge society will depend on reliable digital content. Terminology is indispensable here. This is because terminology plays a crucial role wherever and whenever specialized information and knowledge is being prepared (e.g. in research and development), used (e.g. in specialized texts), recorded and processed (e.g. in data banks), passed on (via training and teaching), implemented (e.g. in technology and knowledge transfer), or translated and interpreted. In the age of globalization the need for methodology standards concerning multilingual digital content is increasing - ISO/TC 37 has developed over the years the expertise for methodology standards for science and technology related content in textual form.

== Terminology standardization ==
The beginnings of terminology standardization are closely linked to the standardization efforts of IEC (International Electrotechnical Commission, founded in 1906) and ISO (International Organization for Standardization, founded in 1946).

A terminology standard according to ISO/IEC Guide 2 (1996) is defined as "standard that is concerned with terms, usually accompanied by their definitions, and sometimes by explanatory notes, illustrations, examples, etc."

ISO 1087-1:2000 defines terminology as "set of designations belonging to one special language" and designations as "representation of a concept by a sign which denotes it". Here, concept representation goes beyond terms (being only linguistic signs), which is also supported by the state-of-the-art of terminology science, according to which terminology has three major functions:

1. basic elements carrying meaning in domain communication,
2. ordering of scientific-technical knowledge at the level of concepts,
3. access to other representations of specialized information and knowledge.

The above indicates that terminological data (comprising various kinds of knowledge representation) possibly have a much more fundamental role in domain-related information and knowledge than commonly understood.

Today, terminology standardization can be subdivided into two distinct activities:

- standardization of terminologies,
- standardization of terminological principles and methods.

The two are mutually interdependent, since the standardization of terminologies would not result in high-quality terminological data, if certain common principles, rules and methods are not observed. On the other hand, these standardized terminological principles, rules and methods must reflect the state-of-the-art of theory and methodology development in those domains, in which terminological data have to be standardized in connection with the formulation of subject standards.

Terminology gained a special position in the field of standardization at large, which is defined as "activity of establishing, with regard to actual or potential problems, provisions for common and repeated use, aimed at the achievement of the optimum degree of order in a given context" (ISO/IEC 1996). Every technical committee or sub-committee or working group has to standardize subject matters, define and standardize its respective terminology. There is a consensus that terminology standardization precedes subject standardization (or "subject standardization requires terminology standardization").

== History of ISO/TC 37 ==
ISO/TC 37 was put into operation in 1952 in order "to find out and formulate general principles of terminology and terminological lexicography" (as terminography was called at that time).

The history of terminology standardization proper - if one excludes earlier attempts in the field of metrology - started in the International Electrotechnical Commission (IEC), which was founded in London in 1906 following a recommendation passed at the International Electrical Congress, held in St. Louis, United States, on 15 September 1904, to the extent that: "...steps should be taken to secure the co-operation of the technical societies of the world, by the appointment of a representative Commission to consider the question of the standardization of the nomenclature and ratings of electrical apparatus and machinery". From the very beginning, IEC considered it its foremost task to standardize the terminology of electrotechnology for the sake of the quality of its subject standards, and soon embarked upon the International Electrotechnical Vocabulary (IEV), whose first edition, based on many individual terminology standards, was published in 1938. The IEV is still being continued today, covering 77 chapters as parts of the International Standard series IEC 60050. The IEV Online Database can be accessed on Electropedia

The predecessor to the International Organization for Standardization (ISO), the International Federation of Standardizing Associations (ISA, founded in 1926), made a similar experience. But it went a step further and - triggered by the publication of Eugen Wüster's book "Internationale Sprachnormung in der Technik" [International standardization of technical language] (Wüster 1931) - established in 1936 the Technical Committee ISA/TC 37 "Terminology" for the sake of formulating general principles and rules for terminology standardization.

ISA/TC 37 conceived a scheme of four classes of recommendations for terminology standardization mentioned below, but the Second World War interrupted its pioneering work. Nominally, ISO/TC 37 was established from the very beginning of ISO in 1946, but it was decided to re-activate it only in 1951 and the Committee started operation in 1952. Since then until 2009 the secretariat of ISO/TC 37 has been held by the International Information Centre for Terminology (Infoterm), on behalf of the Austrian Standards International Austria. Infoterm, an international non-governmental organization based in Austria, continues to collaborate as a twinning secretariat. After this the administration went to CNIS (China).

== Objective of ISO/TC 37 ==
To prepare standards specifying principles and methods for the preparation and management of language resources within the framework of standardization and related activities. Its technical work results in International Standards (and Technical Reports) covering terminological principles and methods as well as various aspects of computer-assisted terminography. ISO/TC 37 is not responsible for the co-ordination of the terminology standardizing activities of other ISO/TCs.

== Structure of the committee ==
- ISO/TC 37/SC 1 (Principles and methods)
- ISO/TC 37/SC 2 (Terminographical and lexicographical working methods)
- ISO/TC 37/SC 3 (Systems to manage terminology, knowledge and content)
- ISO/TC 37/SC 4 (Language resource management)
- ISO/TC 37/SC 5 (Translation, interpreting and related technology)

== Published Standards ==
- ISO 639 Codes for the representation of names of languages, with the following parts:
  - ISO 639-1:2002 Codes for the representation of names of languages —- Part 1: Alpha-2 code (ISO 639-1/RA - Registration Authority for the maintenance of the code: Infoterm [2])
  - ISO 639-2:1998 Codes for the representation of names of languages —- Part 2: Alpha-3 code (ISO 639-2/RA - Registration Authority for the maintenance of the code: Library of Congress [3])
  - ISO 639-3:2007 Codes for the representation of names of languages —- Part 3: Alpha-3 code for comprehensive coverage of languages (ISO 639-3/RA - Registration Authority for the maintenance of the code: SIL International)
  - ISO 639-4:2010 Codes for the representation of names of languages—Part 4: General principles of coding of the representation of names of languages and related entities
  - ISO 639-5:2008 Codes for the representation of names of languages —- Part 5: Alpha-3 code for language families and groups
- ISO 704:2009 Terminology work —- Principles and methods
- ISO 860:1996 Terminology work —- Harmonization of concepts and terms
- ISO 1087-1:2000 Terminology —- Vocabulary —- Part 1: Theory and application
- ISO 1087-2:2000 Terminology work —- Vocabulary —- Part 2: Computer applications
- ISO 1951:1997 Lexicographical symbols particularly for use in classified defining vocabularies
- ISO 1951:2007 3rd Ed. -- Presentation/Representation of entries in dictionaries – Requirements, recommendations and information
- ISO 6156:1987 Magnetic tape exchange format for terminological / lexicographical records (MATER) (withdrawn)
- ISO 10241:1992 Preparation and layout of international terminology standards
- ISO 10241-1:2011 Terminological entries in standards – General requirements and examples of presentation
- ISO 10241-2:2012 Terminological entries in standards – Part 2: Adoption of standardized *ISO 12199:2000 Alphabetical ordering of multilingual terminological and lexicographical data represented in the Latin alphabet
- ISO 12200:1999 Computer applications in terminology —- Machine-readable terminology interchange format (MARTIF) —- Negotiated interchange
- ISO 12615:2004 Bibliographic references and source identifiers for terminology work
- ISO 12616:2002 Translation-oriented terminography
- ISO 12620:1999 Computer applications in terminology —- Data categories obsoleted by ISO 12620:2009
- ISO 12620:2009 Terminology and other language and content resources—Specification of data categories and management of a Data Category Registry for language resources
- ISO 15188:2001 Project management guidelines for terminology standardization
- ISO 16642:2003 Computer applications in terminology —- Terminology Mark-up Framework (TMF)
- ISO 17100:2015 Translation Services-Requirements for Translation Services
- ISO 22128:2008 Guide to terminology products and services – Overview and Guidance
- ISO 23185:2009 Assessment and benchmarking of terminological resources – General concepts, principles and requirements
- ISO 24613:2008 Language Resource Management - Lexical Markup-Framework (LMF)
- ISO 30042:2008 Systems to manage terminology, knowledge and content—TermBase eXchange (TBX)

== Standards and other ISO deliverables in preparation ==
Note: Current status is not mentioned here - see ISO Website for most recent status. Many of these are in development.:

- ISO 704 Terminology work - Principles and methods
- ISO 860.2 Terminology work - Harmonization of concepts & terms
- ISO 1087-1 Terminology work - Vocabulary - Part 1: Theory and application
- ISO 12618 Computer applications in terminology - Design, implementation and use of terminology management systems
- ISO 12620 Terminology and other content and language resources — Specification of data categories and management of a Data Category Registry for language resources
- ISO 21829 Language resource management - Terminology (TLM)
- ISO 22130 Additional language coding
- ISO 22134 Practical guide for socio-terminology
- ISO 22274 Internationalization and concept-related aspects of classification systems
- ISO 24156 Guidelines for applying concept modelling in terminology work
- ISO 24610-1 Language resource management - Feature structures - Part 1: Feature structure representation
- ISO 24610-2 Language resource management - Feature structures - Part 2: Feature systems declaration (FSD)
- ISO 24611 Language resource management - Morpho-syntactic annotation framework
- ISO 24612 Language resource management - Linguistic Annotation Framework
- ISO 24614-1 Language resource management - Word Segmentation of Written Texts for Mono-lingual and Multi-lingual Information Processing - Part 1: General principles and methods
- ISO 24614-2 Language resource management - Word Segmentation of Written Texts for Mono-lingual and Multi-lingual Information Processing - Part 2: Word segmentation for Chinese, Japanese and Korean
- ISO 24615 Language resource management - Syntactic Annotation Framework (SynAF)
- ISO 24617-3 Language resource management - Named entities
- ISO 26162 Design, implementation and maintenance of terminology management systems
- ISO 29383 Terminology policies - Development and Implementation
