= Interface (communication studies) =

In communication studies, the notion of an interface in the work environment is used for a point of interaction between a number of systems or work groups. In the manufacturing environment, the coordination and interaction between several work groups is used to communicate plans and control production activity. This interaction can be schedules, human interactions, computer systems, or any other medium of communication. A physical interface is the interconnection between two items of hardware or machinery.
