= HP Sprout =

2014 personal computer from HP Inc

Sprout

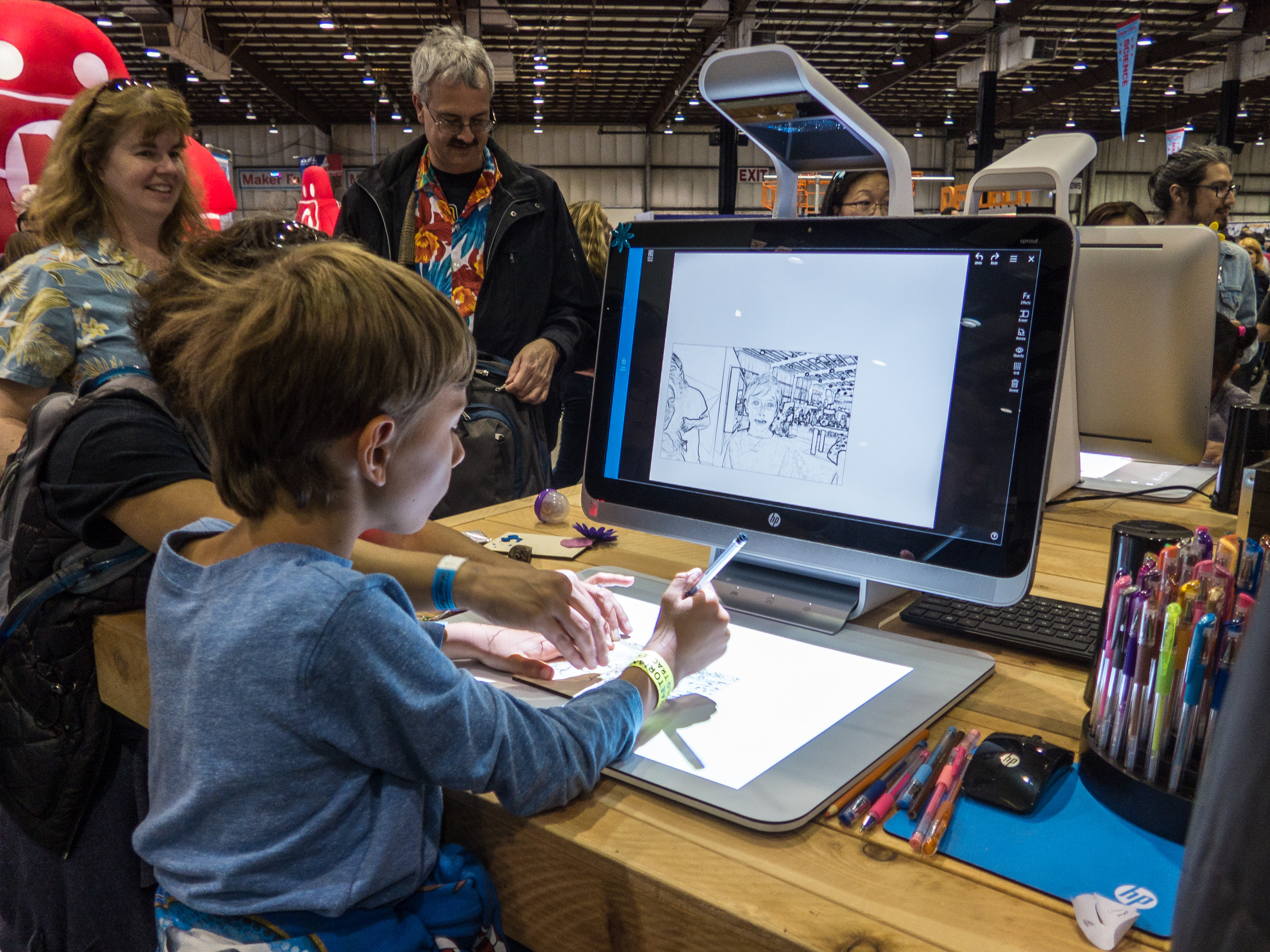
- Sprout at Maker Faire
- Type: Immersive computer
- Inventor: Brad Short
- Inception: 2014, 2016, 2017
- Manufacturer: HP Inc. (formerly Hewlett-Packard)
- Models: Sprout, Sprout Pro, Sprout Pro G2
- Website: Sprout Sprout Pro Sprout Pro G2

Sprout by HP (stylized in lowercase) was a personal computer from HP Inc. announced on 29 October 2014, and released for sale on November 9, 2014. The system was conceived by Brad Short, Distinguished Technologist at HP Inc., who along with Louis Kim, Head of the Immersive Computing Group at HP Inc., co-founded and led a team within HP Inc. to develop and productize the computing concept.

== Launch ==
Sprout was launched in tandem with HP's Jet Fusion 3D Printer (formerly Multi Jet Fusion, MJF), a powder bed fusion 3D printing platform. Together, the product launches unveiled a 3D strategy to enable blended reality workflows, bridging the physical-to-digital and digital-to-physical divides, simplifying creation and collaboration in productivity, education, engineering, and manufacturing.

== Description ==
=== Dual displays ===
Sprout is a novel immersive computing configuration consisting of dual interactive touch screens: one a traditional LCD, the other a unique horizontally projected display called the "TouchMat", a 2.5mm thick flexible touch-sensitive mat. The interactive screens are positioned in a novel orientation, one above the other, one facing forward, one facing upward, instead of side-by-side. The vertical screen serves as a traditional PC display positioned in front of the user and above the TouchMat display which serves as a unique interactive working surface on the table in front and below the primary display. The TouchMat displays digital content and serves as a 2D and 3D capture platen to place documents and 3D objects for scanning. Once scanned, the digital capture of the document or 3D object is re-projected coincident with the original document or 3D object at true scale, resulting in a hyper real effect due to the superposition of the actual physical content and its superimposed digital twin.

=== Illuminator ===
The signature integrated column and armature called the "Sprout Illuminator" is positioned above and behind the vertical display and houses a custom DLP projector, a high resolution camera, and a real-time depth sensor all aiming down at the thin flexible working surface of the TouchMat. Sprout's unique configuration and combination of interactive displays, cameras, and sensors enables immersive interactions that blend the physical and digital domains allowing, for example, documents and objects to co-exist with digital content projected on the TouchMat. The physical content can also be instantly 2D scanned or quickly 3D scanned and re-projected on the TouchMat (effectively converted from the physical domain to the digital domain) ready for digital manipulation in an intuitive manner as if working on paper with real objects. This functionality allows for seamless digital creation and remote collaboration using physical media and digital content blended together in a WYSIWYG manner, as well as providing traditional user inputs such as a projected virtual keyboard and a virtual trackpad. For additional user input, Sprout includes an Adonit stylus, as well as a Bluetooth-powered set of keyboard and mouse. This enables users to interact with physical and digital content while working. Content can be digitally captured and manipulated in 2D or 3D directly on the TouchMat interface. HP claims that this greatly simplifies and streamlines the creative process.

== Releases ==
=== Sprout ===
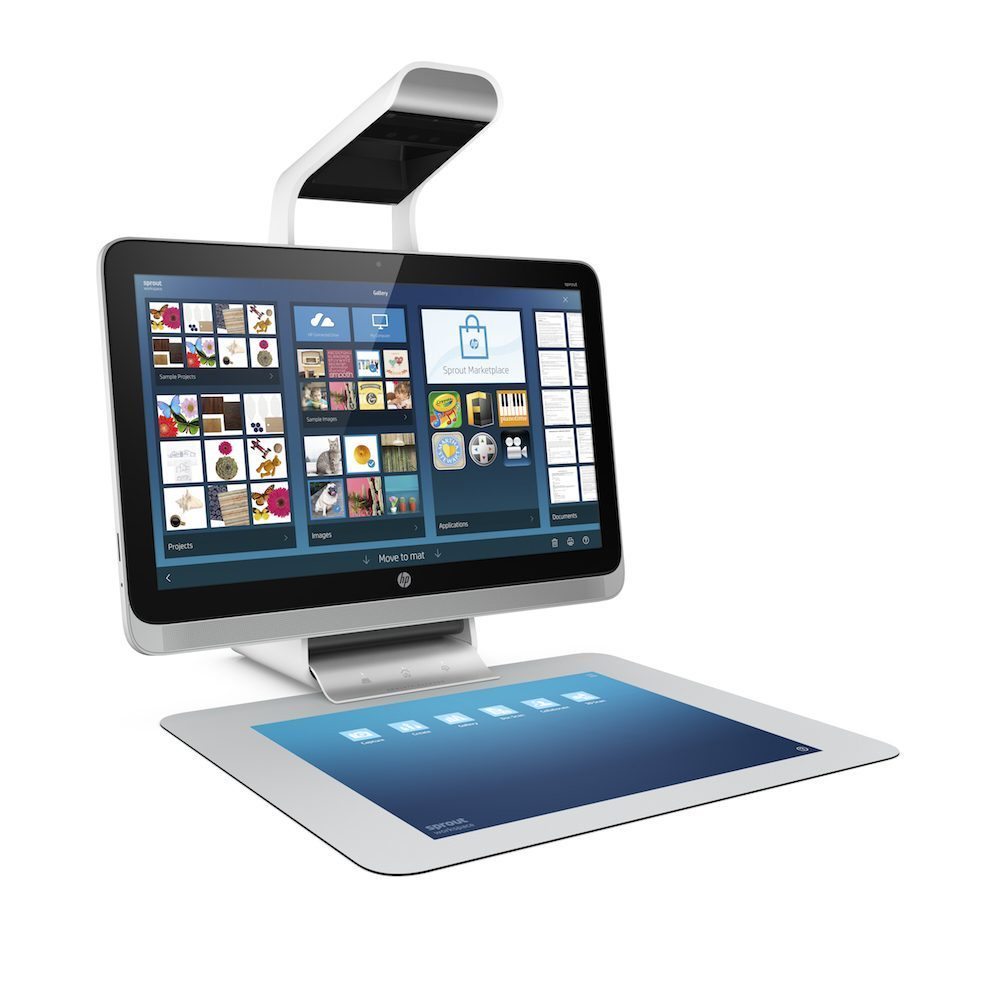
HP Sprout - 2014 worldwide launch

Sprout, launched in 2014, was the original and first model to be commercially introduced.

=== Sprout Pro ===
Sprout Pro, launched in 2016, was an upgraded Pro version of Sprout which received minor compliance updates to internal specs and components in order to add support for commercial markets, enabling expansion into education and retail kiosk applications.

=== Sprout Pro G2 ===
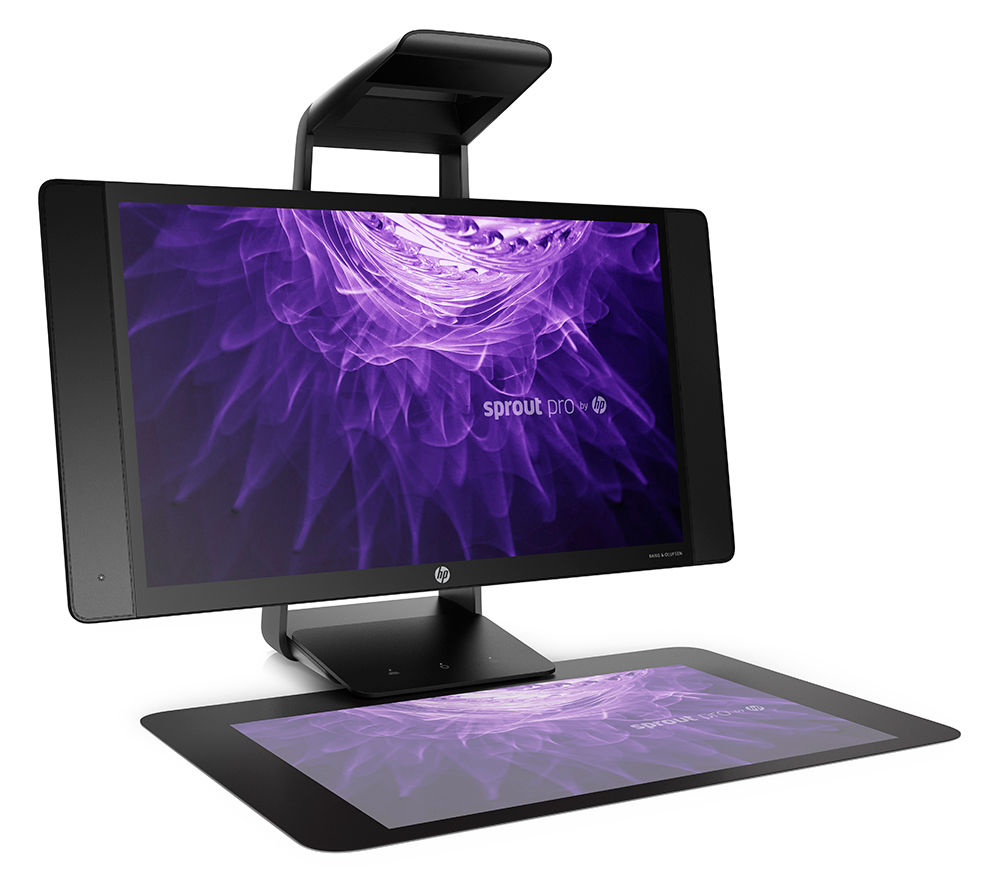
HP Sprout Pro G2 - 2017 worldwide launch

Sprout Pro G2, launched in 2017, was the Gen-2 version of Sprout Pro which received brand new features and a major redesign of both the product hardware (internal components and industrial design) as well as the software. A new custom designed TouchMat was developed to add an active stylus with 256 levels of pressure sensing and palm rejection. The projector for the TouchMat display was upgraded to a full HD 1920 x 1080 pixel resolution to match the vertical display. The Sprout Pro G2 shipped with a new suite of applications called WorkTools that worked seamlessly with all Windows applications to bring 2D capture, 3D scan, and mixed-reality creation tools to existing workflows. Sprout Pro G2 was the last model to be released of the HP Sprout.
