= The International Customer Service Institute =

International partnership organisation for sharing of best practices in customer service

The International Customer Service Institute (TICSI) is an international partnership organisation to enable the recognition and sharing of global best practice in customer service. It was founded in 2005 operating out of London and Dubai and has developed The International Standard for Service Excellence (TISSE). It has regional Certification Partners in the UK, India, Australia, New Zealand and the Middle East.

== See also ==
- British Standards Institution (BSI)
- Canadian Standards Association
- Countries in International Organization for Standardization
- Deutsches Institut für Normung, German Institute for Standardization (DIN)
- European Committee for Standardization (CEN)
- International Classification for Standards
- Standardization
- Standards organization
