= ISO/TC 68 =

ISO/TC 68 is a technical committee formed within the International Organization for Standardization (ISO), of Geneva, Switzerland, tasked with developing and maintaining international standards covering the areas of banking, securities, and other financial services. As the standards organization under ISO responsible for the development of all international financial services standards, ISO/TC 68 plays a key role in the development and adoption of new technologies in the banking, brokerage and insurance industries. Many of its current work projects involve developing ecommerce standards such as better online security for financial transactions, XML standards for financial transactions and standards to reduce the cost and delays of international financial transactions. The membership of ISO/TC 68, consists of more than 30 organizations assigned by participating national standards bodies plus additional international standards development organizations that work collaboratively toward global financial services standards development.

== Technical Subcommittees of ISO/TC 68 ==
Within TC 68 there are, at present, three technical subcommittees, or SC's: ISO/TC 68/SC 2 (Financial Services, security), ISO/TC 68/SC 8 (Reference data for financial services), and ISO/TC 68/SC 9 (Information exchange for financial services). Subcommittees prepare and manage international standards within specific areas of concentration. Subcommittees review existing standards once every five years to update them. New standards are developed by subcommittees under the New Work Item process.

== Standards Development Process ==
New Work Items are proposed by three or more countries that are members of ISO/TC 68. If a New Work Item is approved by a super majority of countries that are members of ISO/TC 68 the New Work Item is assigned to a Working Group under a Technical Subcommittee. Each Working Group consists of technical experts in the field appointed to represent their member countries. After a sequence of revisions to committee drafts, proposed standards developed by a Working Group must be approved by a super majority of countries that are members of ISO/TC 68 before being submitted to ISO for approval as an ISO standard.

=== National Role ===
Where appropriate, national standards setting bodies can propose existing national standards to ISO/TC 68 to become adopted as international standards with the approval of ISO/TC 68 and ISO. These standards must be submitted as New Work Items by three or more member countries of ISO/TC 68.

=== History of ISO/TC 68 ===
In the late 1940s, members of the financial industry came together under the International Organization for Standardization (ISO) to begin developing technical standards for the banking industry to use on a world-wide basis. The original name of the organization working on banking standards was Technical Committee 68, or TC 68-Banking. Over time the scope of TC 68 expanded to include all financial services. TC 68 has continued its basic mission through industry changes and the adoption of new scientific technologies that have fostered greatly increased international commerce. One of the changes made to reflect changes to the financial industry is TC 68's name. It is now referred to as Technical Committee 68 on Banking, Securities and other Financial Services.

=== TC 68 Secretariat ===
ANSI ASC X9 holds a unique position within this ISO framework. It is the Secretariat to TC 68 and is also the leader of the official United States Technical Advisory Group (TAG) which represents the U.S. financial services industry to the international technical committee.
