= Social interface =

Concept in sociology

Social interface is a concept from social science (particularly, media ecology (Marshall McLuhan) and sociology of technology).

It can be approached from a theoretical or a practical perspective.

As a concept of social interface theory, social interface is defined by Norman Long (1989, 2001). In 2001 his revised definition was:

"a social interface is a critical point of intersection between different lifeworlds, social fields or levels of social organization, where social discontinuities based upon discrepancies in values, interests, knowledges and power, are most likely to be located."

In other words, interfaces are the areas in which social friction can be experienced and where diffusion of new technology is leading to structural discontinuities (which can be both positive or negative), the interface is where they will occur. Long continues to say that:

" ... the concept implies face-to-face encounters between individuals or social units representing different interests and backed by different resources."

Identifying these interfaces and analyzing their effects shows how they are changed by everyday life, and how in return everyday life is changed by the interfaces.

== See also ==
- Interactivity
- Node (networking), an actor in a communication network which makes decisions about message distribution or a communication endpoint
