= Terminology planning policy =

Terminology planning is a planning activity for developing domain communication largely according to the needs and requirements of knowledge representation. Domain-specific conventions of knowledge representation — depending on the domain as such or text within a domain, may comprise not only linguistic representation of concepts (i.e.terms), but also all kinds of non-linguistic representations (e.g. graphs, formulae, numbers, signs, depictions). Therefore, to different degrees depending on the particular domain, terminology planning may have to take into account these non-linguistic representations as well.

== Terminology Planning and Language Planning ==
While the focus of language planning is the deliberate manipulation and development of a linguistic entity to improve communication in society or a language community at large, terminology planning may be language independent or in its objective across languages, aiming at the improvement of communication in a specific domain or application thereof.

While terminology planning is an important part of language planning it may be useful for language communities to separate the two activities for simplification of its complexity in order to better focus programmes and resources, and thus receive better results.

Because language planning also concerns the development of the lexicon of a language, and because domain communication consists to a great extent of linguistic representations of concepts there exists a large area of overlapping between the two concepts. The biggest difference lies in the different point of view and scope (and goal).

== Terminology Policy ==
Public strategy formulated at the level of political decision-making in a more or less autonomous language community with the aim of developing or regulating emerging or existing terminologies for an array of purposes. Examples of such regulated terminologies are the hundreds of standards that the International Organization for Standardization (ISO) publishes on an ongoing basis.

- ISO 2424:2007 Textile floor coverings — Vocabulary
- ISO 3918:2007 Milking machine installations — Vocabulary
- ISO 9999:2007 Assistive products for persons with disability — Classification and terminology
- ISO 23718:2007 Metallic materials — Mechanical testing — Vocabulary
- ISO/TR 24098:2007 Intelligent transport systems — System architecture, taxonomy and terminology

== Target groups of terminology planning policies ==
Strategic planning of terminology work and terminology resources is not only a matter of concern for governments and other public administration. Furthermore, due to the crucial role of terminology for scientific-technical planning, industry, risk communication and business communication processes, as well as basically any other event of domain communication, terminology planning policies play an increasing role for corporate communication of all types (commercial, non-commercial). Especially enterprises increasingly feel the need for a systematic terminology planning in connection with corporate language or language localization and translation questions.

However, despite the need for strategic terminology planning the term "Terminology Planning/Policies" has not caught on in these communities and may be referred to in a variety of other terms. A meta-language is required.
