= International Classification for Standards =

Classification system for technical standards

International Classification for Standards (ICS) is an international classification system for technical standards. It is designed to cover every economic sector and virtually every activity of humankind where technical standards may be used.

The ISO Central Secretariat periodically reviews and updates the classification in consultation with the International Organization for Standardization, the ICS is intended to be a continuous work in progress and is updated when necessary. The latest edition of the ICS can be downloaded free of charge from the ISO web site.

Anyone may submit a proposal for modifications or additions to the ICS.

== Purpose ==
The ICS serves as a structure for catalogues and databases of technical standards and other normative documents, and as a basis for standing-order systems for international, regional and national standards.

== Classification principles ==
The ICS uses an hierarchical classification, which consists of three nested levels called fields (Level 1), groups (Level 2) and sub-groups (Level 3). Each field is subdivided into groups, which are further divided into sub-groups.

All classification levels are designated by a classification code (called notation) and a title. The notation is a set of Arabic numerals.

Top-level items, which have no parent levels, use a two-digit notation, for example:

43 ROAD VEHICLE ENGINEERING

The notations for groups and sub-groups include the parent-level notations. The example below shows a notation for Sub-Group 20 (Level 3), which belongs to Group 040 (Level 2) in Field 43 (Level 1).

43.040.20 Lighting, signaling and warning devices

=== Level 1 (Fields) ===
A field is the first level in the International Classification for Standards. It may represent one or a combination of the following:

- A sector of the economy such as agriculture, mining, construction or the packaging industry;
- A technology such as telecommunications or food processing;
- An activity such as environment protection, safety assurance and protection of public health;
- A field of science such as mathematics or astronomy.

At present the classification includes 40 fields:

01 Generalities, terminology, standardization, documentation
03 Services, company organization, management and quality, administration, transport, sociology
07 Mathematics, natural sciences
11 Health care technology
13 Environment, health protection, safety
17 Metrology and measurement, physical phenomena
19 Testing
21 Mechanical systems and components for general use
23 Fluid systems and components for general use
25 Manufacturing engineering
27 Energy and heat transfer engineering
29 Electrical engineering
31 Electronics
33 Telecommunications, audio and video engineering
35 Information technology, office machines
37 Image technology
39 Precision mechanics, jewelry
43 Road vehicles engineering
45 Railway engineering
47 Shipbuilding and marine structures
49 Aircraft and space vehicle engineering
53 Materials handling equipment
55 Packaging and distribution of goods
59 Textile and leather technology
61 Clothing industry
65 Agriculture
67 Food technology
71 Chemical technology
73 Mining and minerals
75 Petroleum, and related technologies
77 Metallurgy
79 Wood technology
81 Glass and ceramics industries
83 Rubber and plastics industries
85 Paper technology
87 Paint and colour industries
91 Construction materials and building
93 Civil engineering
95 Military engineering
97 Domestic and commercial equipment, entertainment, sports.

=== Level 2 (Groups) ===
The ICS second level, the group, is a subdivision of the field.

=== Level 3 (Sub-Groups) ===
Sub-groups are used in the ICS to subdivide groups into subjects that certain to a particular aspect of the subject covered by a given group. Regardless of the subject, virtually all groups include a sub-group No. 01 that covers the complete subject of the respective group. In addition, most of the groups contain a sub-group No. 99 for standards on subjects which do not correspond either to the subjects of the general sub-groups or to the subjects of the specific sub-groups of the respective groups.

=== Level 4 (Units) ===
Level 4 subdivisions are not part of the official ICS document. The ICS rules however allow users of the classification system to subdivide the official ICS sub-groups into so-called units, making them a Level 4 component of the International Classification for Standards. This is accomplished by adding a two-digit number to the notation of the sub-group being subdivided. However, instead of a period, new notations use a hyphen as a separator. For example:

35.220.20-10 Magnetic tapes

== Statistics ==
- The International Classification for Standards has 99 top-level divisions of which only 40 are presently used. The remaining 59 divisions are reserved for topics that are not yet known.
- There are three "official" levels in the ICS system, each holding ninety nine (99), nine hundred and ninety nine (999) and ninety nine (99) subsets, respectively.
- Each field of the ICS is designed to hold a maximum of 999 groups.
- Although any group in the ICS may contain no more than 99 "official" sub-groups, the holding capacity of the group can be expanded 99 times by using "unofficial" Level 4 subdivisions, an option that is built into the ICS. Adding Level 4 subdivisions to all sub-groups within a group increases the group's holding capacity to 9 801 subjects.
- The expanded version of the International Classification for Standards is capable of covering nearly 1 billion subjects (969,328,701 to be exact). This can be achieved without any restructuring of its numerical coding system. Since there are currently about 780 000 national standards in the world, the number of subjects that the ICS can offer for classification purposes exceeds 1 200 times the total number of documents that are available for classification.
