= Automotive SPICE =

Automotive industry maturity model

Automotive SPICE is a maturity model adapted for the automotive industry. It assesses the maturity of development processes for electronic and software-based systems (e.g., ECUs). It is based on an initiative of the Special Interest Group Automotive and the Quality Management Center (QMC) in the German Association of the Automotive Industry (VDA).

The abbreviation SPICE stands for Software Process Improvement and Capability Determination. Automotive SPICE (also commonly abbreviated as ASPICE) combines a process reference model and a process assessment model in one standard.

It conforms to the regulations of the ISO/IEC 33xxx family (process assessment), e.g., ISO/IEC 33001, ISO/IEC 33002, ISO/IEC 33004, and ISO/IEC 33020.

== Trademark ==
The name Automotive SPICE is protected by trademark law and is the property of the VDA.

== Capability levels ==
There are six capability levels, referred to as Levels. Level 0 is the lowest capability level; Level 5 is the highest capability level. The capability levels are named and characterized for each process as follows:

- Level 0 = "incomplete"; incomplete.
- Level 1 = "performed"; the process purpose is fulfilled by executing the base practices and generating the output work products.
- Level 2 = "managed"; the process performance is planned and monitored at the project level; the work products are managed and checked according to a project-specific standard.
- Level 3 = "Established"; process performance follows an organization-wide defined standard process.
- Level 4 = "Predictable"; process execution is controlled by metrics
- Level 5 = "Innovating"; metrics obtained from process execution are used to optimize processes.

== Automotive SPICE assessments ==
Automotive SPICE Assessment aim at objectively evaluating the development processes using the Process Assessment Model (PAM) for a defined organization. Each Automotive SPICE process part is assessed separately and assigned its maturity level. For example, the following process groups are considered: System Development (SYS), Software Development (SWE), Project Management (MAN), Support Processes (SUP), etc. which are mentioned in the current standard.

In the planning for an assessment, the client of the assessment (also called "sponsor") and the leader of the assessment (also called "lead assessor") define the processes of the process dimension that are relevant to the context of the organization, the maturity level to be assessed and the process instances (e.g., development sites).

According to Automotive SPICE, the requirements from the ISO/IEC 33020:2015 (formerly ISO/IEC 15504-2) standard apply to the performance of compliant Automotive SPICE assessments, e.g., about the competence of the lead assessor, the creation of input documents, the activities to be performed, the creation of output documents, and the comprehensive documentation of the entire assessment process.

== Training and qualification ==
The participants of Automotive SPICE assessments, especially those responsible for performing an assessment, must have the necessary knowledge of Automotive SPICE. This is done by training, successful certification, and proof of the regularly performed activity as an assessor. Training providers and qualification bodies exist for this purpose, as listed below.

The following qualification bodies are known:

- iNTACS (International Assessor Certification Scheme), and

In this context, iNTACS e.V. is the cooperation partner of the VDA, which has developed a scheme of the same name for the training of assessors (examiners). The scheme fulfills the qualification requirements of the Manufacturer Initiative Software (HIS)[3][4] (see also AUTOSAR and ISO 26262) and those from ISO/IEC 15504-2. There are cooperation agreements between iNTACS e.V. and VDA to jointly ensure the training and certification of Automotive SPICE assessors at a high-quality standard and further develop the scheme.

As of 2025, there are approximately 7600 registered assessors.

The latest version of Automotive SPICE was released in November 2023 as Automotive SPICE 4.0.

== History ==
Automotive SPICE was developed in 2001 by AUTOSIG (Automotive Special Interest Group), which includes the German car manufacturers Audi, BMW, Daimler, Porsche, and Volkswagen, as well as international car manufacturers and interest groups such as Fiat, Ford, Jaguar, Land Rover, Volvo, the SPICE User Group, and the Procurement Forum.

Starting around 2007, the German automotive manufacturers Audi, BMW, Daimler, Porsche, and Volkswagen agreed on a common scope of the minimum processes to be considered in an assessment as part of the Manufacturer Initiative Software (HIS) (formerly HIS Scope, subsequently: VDA Scope).

As of January 1, 2007, only Automotive SPICE assessments were accepted by the members of HIS in the context of joint project work with suppliers.

The current (as of 2023) valid edition is Automotive SPICE 4.0, published by VDA and QMC in December 2023. The following translations are available: English, Japanese, Korean, and Chinese.[7] This latest version replaces the Automotive SPICE 3.1.

The model is continuously being developed or improved by the working groups above.[9] Two extensions are shown below.

== Extensions ==
=== Cybersecurity ===
Starting around 2021, information security will be specified and tested as part of Automotive SPICE.[10] Cybersecurity is not part of version 3.1. See also the SAE J3061 standard on the topic.

=== Mechanical engineering ===
SPICE for Mechanical Engineering (ME-SPICE for short) is an extension of Automotive SPICE according to the plug-in concept defined there. The purpose of ME-SPICE is to evaluate the performance of the development processes for mechanical systems or the mechanical parts of mechatronic systems.

== See also ==
- Capability Maturity Model Integration (CMMI)
- ISO/IEC 12207
- ISO/IEC 15288
- ISO/IEC 15504
- ISO/IEC 33001
- IEEE 829

== Literature ==
=== Articles ===
- Charles Murphy: Automotive SPICE: 0-60 in No Time Flat. In: IEEE Engineering Management Review. Vol. 47, No. 2, June 1, 2019, pp. 26–28, doi:10.1109/EMR.2019.2915217.
- Georg Macher et al.: An Integrated View on Automotive SPICE, Functional Safety and Cyber-Security. 2020, p. 2020-, doi:10.4271/2020-01-0145.
- Christoph Stoiber et al.: Keeping Your Maturity Assessment Alive: A Method for the Continuous Tracking and Assessment of Organizational Capabilities and Maturity. In: Business & Information Systems Engineering. March 31, 2023, doi:10.1007/s12599-023-00805-y.

== Reference books ==
Most books about Automotive SPICE are traditionally published in the German language. The following books are available in English:

- Automotive SPICE in Practice: Surviving Implementation and Assessment (Rockynook Computing), ISBN 978-1-933952-29-1
- Automotive SPICE Essentials: Automotive SPICE v3.1 – at a glance (E/E Engineering Essentials), Klaus Hoermann (Author), Peter Abowd (Author), Bhaskar Vanamali (Author), Dan Wall (Author), ISBN 978-3-945547-30-4
