= Maxdata Software =

Portuguese software development company

Maxdata Software is a Portugal-based company that develops healthcare software. Maxdata is one of the developers of Clinidata software, which is used in Portuguese hospitals and laboratories, and responsibility terms management.

Maxdata Software began operating under the ISO/IEC 20000 international standard in 2011.

== List of Clindata products ==
- XXI – software for clinical pathology
- ANP – software for anatomic pathology
- BST – software for immunohematology
- NET – software for electronic prescription
- TRM – software for responsibility terms management
- VEP – software for epidemiologic surveillance
