= Stuart Arnold =

British engineer

Stuart Arnold (1945–2015) was a UK systems engineering professional, with a degree in electrical engineering from Leeds University.

Stuart Arnold had a background in private and public sector engineering management applied to systems and software products and services. This spanned the leadership of engineering teams, the application of new technology and conducting research into systems engineering.

Stuart’s career started in microwave technology at Roke Manor Research in the UK. His systems engineering knowledge drew heavily on many years of international industrial experience working for Philips in the development, manufacture and product support of domestic, professional and defence systems. He was Software Engineering Manager for Thorn EMI Sensors before moving into government service as Systems Engineering Manager in the UK’s Defence Evaluation and Research Agency, later a QinetiQ Fellow and QinetiQ’s Systems Engineering Head of Profession.

Stuart contributed to establishing a common international understanding of the discipline of systems engineering, and to its presentation as a natural and essential element of business practice. As the Editor of the systems engineering International Standards, ISO/IEC 15288 and its companion assessment model ISO/IEC 15504 Part 6, Stuart was at the heart of ISO actions to establish systems engineering as a cardinal component of international trade and commerce. He was also a recognized contributor to both IEEE 1220 and EIA-632.

Stuart was a Chartered Engineer in the UK, a Fellow of the Institution of Engineering and Technology, and a Fellow of the International Council of Systems Engineering (INCOSE).

== Achievements ==
- Editor of ISO/IEC 15288:2003 Systems life cycle processes.
- PhD in Systems Engineering at Cranfield University in 2009, with a thesis entitled "Transforming system engineering principles into integrated project team practice".
- Appointed as a visiting professor by the Royal Academy of Engineering to the University of Hertfordshire in 2009.
- Editor of ISO/IEC 15504:2013 Process assessment—Part 6: An exemplar system life cycle process assessment model.

== Notable publications ==
- Systems engineering - Coping with complexity (by Richard Stevens, Peter Brook, Ken Jackson, Stuart Arnold) -- Pearson Education, 1998—ISBN 0130950858, 9780130950857.
