= Trillium Model =

The Trillium Model, created by a collaborative team from Bell Canada, Northern Telecom and Bell Northern Research (Northern Telecom and Bell Northern Research later merged into Nortel Networks) combines requirements from the ISO 9000 series, the Capability Maturity Model (CMM) for software, and the Baldrige Criteria for Performance Excellence, with software quality standards from the IEEE. Trillium has a telecommunications orientation and provides customer focus. The practices in the Trillium Model are derived from a benchmarking exercise which focused on all practices that would contribute to an organization's product development and support capability. The Trillium Model covers all aspects of the software development life-cycle, most system and product development and support activities, and a significant number of related marketing activities. Many of the practices described in the model can be applied directly to hardware development.

== Objectives ==
The Trillium Model has been developed from a customer perspective, as perceived in a competitive, commercial environment. The Model is used in a variety of ways:

- In benchmarking an organization's product development and support process capability against best practices in the industry,
- In self-assessment mode, to help identify opportunities for improvement within a product development organization, and
- In pre-contractual negotiations, to assist in selecting a supplier.

This Model and its accompanying tools are not in themselves a product development process or life-cycle model. Rather, the Trillium Model provides key industry best practices which can be used to improve an existing process or life-cycle

== Scale ==
The Trillium scale spans levels 1 through 5. Levels can be characterized in the following way:

1. Unstructured: The development process is ad hoc. Projects often cannot meet quality or schedule targets. Success, while possible, is based on individuals rather than on organizational infrastructure. (Risk – High)
2. Repeatable and Project Oriented: Individual project success is achieved through strong project management planning and control, with emphasis on requirements management, estimation techniques, and configuration management. (Risk – Medium)
3. Defined and Process Oriented: Processes are defined and used at the organizational level, although project customization is still permitted. Processes are controlled and improved. ISO 9001 requirements such as training and internal process auditing are incorporated. (Risk – Low)
4. Managed and Integrated: Process instrumentation and analysis is used as a key mechanism for process improvement. Process change management and defect prevention programs are integrated into processes. CASE tools are integrated into processes. (Risk – Lower)
5. Fully Integrated: Formal methodologies are extensively used. Organizational repositories for development history and process are used and effective. (Risk – Lowest)

== Architecture ==
The Trillium Model consists of Capability Areas, Roadmaps and Practices. There are four different ways in which the Trillium Model is typically applied.

The Capability Evaluation and Capability Joint-Assessment are two methods of evaluating an organization's product development and support process capability. A Capability Evaluation is the evaluation of a supplier by a second party, typically the customer. A Capability Joint Evaluation assumes an effective partnership relationship exists between the customer and supplier.

== Benefits ==
For Customer organizations, a higher capability means that:

- the development organization is more responsive to customer and market demands,
- the life-cycle cost of the product(s) is minimized, and
- end-user satisfaction is maximized.

For the Development organization, achieving a higher capability can result in:

- lower development and maintenance costs,
- shorter cycle time and development intervals,
- an increased ability to achieve content and schedule commitments due to effective project risk analysis and effort estimation, and
- an increasing ability to meet quantifiable design and quality objectives at all stages of the development process

== Comparison with CMM ==
The Trillium Model covers all aspects of the software development life-cycle, most system and product development and support activities, and a significant number of related marketing activities. Although Trillium has been designed to be applied to embedded software systems such as telecommunications systems, much of the model can be applied to other segments of the software industry such as management information systems (MIS). The various differences between the Trillium Model and the Capability Maturity Model (CMM) as given as follow:

1. Trillium architecture is based on roadmaps, rather than key process areas (KPAs) present in CMM
2. Trillium has a wider product perspective rather than only based on software process improvement
3. Trillium claims a wider coverage of capability impacting issues.
4. Trillium has orientation towards customer focus, technological maturity and telecommunication industry.
