= ISO/IEC JTC 1/SC 32 =

ISO/IEC JTC 1/SC 32 Data management and interchange is a standardization subcommittee of the Joint Technical Committee ISO/IEC JTC 1 of the International Organization for Standardization (ISO) and the International Electrotechnical Commission (IEC), which develops and facilitates standards within the field of data management and interchange. The international secretariat of ISO/IEC JTC 1/SC 32 is the American National Standards Institute (ANSI) located in the United States.

== History ==
ISO/IEC JTC 1/SC 32 was formed in 1997, as a combination of the following three ISO/IEC JTC 1 subgroups: ISO/IEC JTC 1/SC 21/WG 3, Database; ISO/IEC JTC 1/SC 14, Data elements; and ISO/IEC JTC 1/SC 30, Open-edi. The new subcommittee was established with the intention of developing, and facilitating the development of, standards for data management within local and distributed information system environments. ISO/IEC JTC 1/SC 32 was originally made up of five working groups (WGs). ISO/IEC JTC 1/SC 32/WG 5, Database access and interchange, was disbanded in March 2002. WG 4, SQL multimedia and application packages, was disbanded in May, 2018. The three other original working groups of the subcommittee are currently active, although the title of ISO/IEC JTC 1/SC 32/WG 1 was changed from Open-edi to its current title, e-Business. A new working group, WG 6 Data usage, was added in 2020.

== Scope ==
The scope of ISO/IEC JTC 1/SC 32 is “Standards for data management within and among local and distributed information systems environments. SC 32 provides enabling technologies to promote harmonization of data management facilities across sector-specific areas. Specifically, SC32 standards include:”

- Reference models and frameworks for the coordination of existing and emerging standards
- Definition of data domains, data types, and data structures, and their associated semantics
- Languages, services, and protocols for persistent storage, concurrent access and concurrent update, and interchange of data
- Methods, languages, services, and protocols to structure, organize, and register metadata and other information resources associated with sharing and interoperability, including electronic commerce

== Structure ==
ISO/IEC JTC 1/SC 32 is made up of four active working groups, each of which carries out specific tasks in standards development within the field of data management and interchange. As a response to changing standardization needs, working groups of ISO/IEC JTC 1/SC 32 can be disbanded if their area of work is no longer applicable, or established if new working areas arise. The focus of each working group is described in the group’s terms of reference. Active working groups of ISO/IEC JTC 1/SC 32 are:

Working Group	Working Area
ISO/IEC JTC 1/SC 32/WG 1	e-Business
ISO/IEC JTC 1/SC 32/WG 2	Metadata
ISO/IEC JTC 1/SC 32/WG 3	Database languages
ISO/IEC JTC 1/SC 32/WG 6	Data usage

== Collaborations ==
ISO/IEC JTC 1/SC 32 works in close collaboration with a number of other organizations or subcommittees, both internal and external to ISO or IEC, in order to avoid conflicting or duplicative work. Organizations internal to ISO or IEC that collaborate with or are in liaison to ISO/IEC JTC 1/SC 32 include:

- ISO/IEC JTC 1/SC 7, Software and systems engineering
- ISO/IEC JTC 1/SC 25, Interconnection of information technology equipment
- ISO/IEC JTC 1/SC 38, Cloud Computing and Distributed Platforms
- ISO/TC 12, Quantities and units
- ISO/TC 37, Terminology and other language and content resources
- ISO/TC 37/SC 2, Terminographical and lexicographical working methods
- ISO/TC 37/SC 3, Systems to manage terminology, knowledge and content
- ISO/TC 37/SC 4, Language resource management
- ISO/TC 46/SC 4, Technical interoperability
- ISO/TC 46/SC 11, Archives/records management
- ISO/TC 68/SC 2, Financial Services, security
- ISO/TC 127, Earth-moving machinery
- ISO/TC 154, Processes, data elements and documents in commerce, industry and administration
- ISO/TC 184, Automation systems and integration
- ISO/TC 184/SC 4, Industrial data
- ISO/TC 204, Intelligent transport systems
- ISO/TC 211, Geographic information/Geomatics
- ISO/TC 215, Health informatics
- ISO/TC 232, Learning services outside formal education

Some organizations external to ISO or IEC that collaborate with or are in liaison to ISO/IEC JTC 1/SC 32 include:

- International Confederation of Societies of Authors and Composers (CISAC)
- Dublin Core Metadata Initiative (DCMI)
- EUROSTAT
- International Telecommunications Satellite Organization (ITSO)
- ITU
- Infoterm
- Object Management Group (OMG)
- Society for Worldwide Interbank Financial Telecommunication (SWIFT)
- UN/CEFACT
- United Nations Economic Commission for Europe (UNECE)
- World Meteorological Organization (WMO)
- W3C

== Member countries ==
Countries pay a fee to ISO to be members of subcommittees.

The 14 "P" (participating) members of ISO/IEC JTC 1/SC 32 are: Canada, China, Czech Republic, Côte d'Ivoire, Egypt, Finland, Germany, India, Japan, Republic of Korea, Portugal, Russian Federation, United Kingdom, and United States.

The 22 "O" (observing) members of ISO/IEC JTC 1/SC 32 are: Australia, Austria, Belgium, Bosnia and Herzegovina, France, Ghana, Hungary, Iceland, Indonesia, Islamic Republic of Iran, Ireland, Italy, Kazakhstan, Luxembourg, Netherlands, Norway, Poland, Romania, Serbia, Spain, Switzerland, and Turkey.

== Published standards ==
ISO/IEC JTC 1/SC 32 standards are meant to structure, organize, and register metadata and other information resources associated with sharing and interoperability, including electronic commerce. ISO/IEC JTC 1/SC 32 currently has 74 published standards within the field of data management and interchange, including:

ISO/IEC Standard	Title	Status	Description	WG
ISO/IEC 14662 free	Information technology – Open-edi reference model	Published (2010)	Specifies the framework for coordinating the integration of existing International Standards and the development of future International Standards for the interworking of Open-edi parties through Open-edi	1
ISO/IEC 15944-1 free	Information technology – Business Operational View – Part 1: Operational aspects of Open-edi for implementation	Published (2011)	Allows constraints, including legal requirements, commercial and/or international trade and contract terms, public policy, and laws and regulations, to be defined and integrated into Open-edi through the business operational view (BOV)	1
ISO/IEC 11179-3 free	Information technology – Metadata registries (MDR) – Part 3: Registry metamodel and basic attributes	Published (2013)	Specifies the structure of a metadata registry in the form of a conceptual data model and specifies basic attributes which are required to describe metadata items	2
ISO/IEC TR 20943-1 free	Information technology – Procedures for achieving metadata registry content consistency – Part 1: Data elements	Published (2003)	“Describes a set of procedures for the consistent registration of data elements and their attributes in a registry.”	2
ISO/IEC 20944-1	Information technology – Metadata Registries Interoperability and Bindings (MDR-IB) – Part 1: Framework, common vocabulary, and common provisions for conformance	Published (2013)	Contains the overview, framework, common vocabulary, and common provisions for conformance for the ISO/IEC 20944 series, which provides the bindings and their interoperability for MDRs	2
ISO/IEC 19502	Information technology – Meta Object Facility (MOF)	Published (2005)	Defines a metamodel using MOF, and a set of interfaces using Open Distributed Processing (ODP) that can be used to define and manipulate a set of interoperable metamodels and their corresponding models	2
ISO/IEC 19773	Information technology – Metadata Registries (MDR) modules	Published (2011)	Specifies small modules of data to be used or reused in applications	2
ISO/IEC 9075-1 free	Information technology – Database languages – SQL – Part 1: Framework (SQL/Framework)	Published (2011)	Defines the conceptual framework to specify the grammar of SQL and the result of processing statements in that language by an SQL-implementation	3
ISO/IEC 13249-3	Information technology – Database languages – SQL multimedia and application packages – Part 3: Spatial	Published (2011)	“Defines spatial user-defined types, routines, and schemas for generic spatial data handling.”	4

=== SQL ===
The committee is responsible for the SQL standard, which has seen ten revisions since its initial publication in 1986. As of 2023, the most recent update is SQL:2023.

== See also ==
- ISO/IEC JTC 1
- List of ISO standards
- American National Standards Institute
- International Organization for Standardization
- International Electrotechnical Commission
