= ISO/IEC JTC 1/SC 7 =

ISO standardization subcommittee

ISO/IEC Joint Technical Committee 1, Subcommittee 7, Software and systems engineering
- Abbreviation: ISO/IEC JTC1/SC7
- Formation: 1987; 39 years ago
- Merger of: ISO/TC 97 and IEC/TC 83
- Type: Standards organization
- Purpose: Standardization of processes, supporting tools and supporting technologies for the engineering of software products and systems
- Headquarters: Bureau of Indian Standards, India
- Region served: Worldwide
- Members: National standards organisations
- Official language: English, French
- Main organ: Plenary meeting
- Parent organization: ISO/IEC Joint Technical Committee 1
- Website: www.iso.org/committee/45086.html/
- Formerly called: ISO/IEC JTC1/SC7 Software engineering

ISO/IEC JTC 1/SC 7 Software and systems engineering is a standardization subcommittee of the Joint Technical Committee ISO/IEC JTC 1 of the International Organization for Standardization (ISO) and the International Electrotechnical Commission (IEC), that develops and facilitates standards within the field of engineering of software products and systems. The international secretariat of ISO/IEC JTC 1/SC 7 is the Bureau of Indian Standards (BIS) located in India.

== History ==
ISO/IEC JTC 1/SC 7 was first established in 1987, though the origins of the subcommittee began with ISO/TC 97, established in 1960 as a standardization technical committee in the field of information processing. With the formation of ISO/IEC JTC 1 in 1987, ISO/TC 97 and IEC/TC 83 were combined to form ISO/IEC JTC 1/SC 7, Software Engineering. In 2000, the subcommittee changed its title from Software Engineering to its current title, Software and Systems Engineering. ISO/IEC JTC 1/SC 7 held its first plenary in Paris, France in 1987.

== Scope and mission ==
The scope of ISO/IEC JTC 1/SC 7 is the “Standardization of processes, supporting tools and supporting technologies for the engineering of software products and systems,” including

- Software and systems engineering processes
- Software system products
- Enterprise architecture
- Software engineering environment
- Software engineering body of knowledge
- Management of IT assets

The mission of ISO/IEC JTC 1/SC 7 is to

- Provide quality standards that cover the entire life-cycle of information systems
- Provide quality standards that meet user needs in broad markets
- Manage the set of standards effectively through documented framework
- Promote the use of standards by providing supporting materials
- Provide leadership in standardization through:
  - A continuous technology watch process using Study Groups to explore new areas and markets
  - The development of a comprehensive set of integrated standards with broad international and professional consensus
  - Initiating cooperative work with international professional and standards producing organizations
  - A framework that:
    - Facilitates the integration and sub-contracting of standards developed in other standards producing organizations
    - Facilitates cooperative development of joint standards with other international standards producing organizations
    - Minimizes the inconsistencies between ISO/IEC JTC 1/SC 7 standards, including those developed by other standards producing organizations

== Structure ==
As of August 2020, ISO/IEC JTC 1/SC 7 is made up of 14 active working groups (WGs), three ad hoc working groups (AHGs) and five advisory groups (AGs). Each of these groups carries out specific tasks in standards development within the field of systems and software engineering. As a response to standardization needs within the field of software and systems engineering, working groups within ISO/IEC JTC 1/SC 7 were disbanded if their working area was no longer applicable, or established if new working areas arose. The focus of each working group, special working group, advisory group, and task force is described in the group's terms of reference.

Active working groups of ISO/IEC JTC 1/SC 7 are:

Working Group	Working Area
ISO/IEC JTC 1/SC 7/WG 2	System Software Documentation
ISO/IEC JTC 1/SC 7/WG 4	Tools and Environment
ISO/IEC JTC 1/SC 7/WG 6	Software Product and System Quality
ISO/IEC JTC 1/SC 7/WG 7	Life Cycle Management
ISO/IEC JTC 1/SC 7/WG 10	Process Assessment
ISO/IEC JTC 1/SC 7/WG 19	Techniques for Specifying IT Systems
ISO/IEC JTC 1/SC 7/WG 20	Software and Systems Bodies of Knowledge and Professionalization
ISO/IEC JTC 1/SC 7/WG 21	Information Technology Asset Management
ISO/IEC JTC 1/SC 7/WG 22	Vocabulary validation
ISO/IEC JTC 1/SC 7/WG 24	Systems and Software Standards for Very Small Entities
ISO/IEC JTC 1/SC 7/WG 26	Software Testing
ISO/IEC JTC 1/SC 7/JWG 28	Common Industry Formats for Usability Reports (Joint between ISO/IEC JTC 1/SC 7 and ISO/TC 159/SC 4)
ISO/IEC JTC 1/SC 7/WG 29	Agile and DevOps
ISO/IEC JTC 1/SC 7/WG 42	Architecture
Ad Hoc Group	Working Area
ISO/IEC JTC 1/SC 7/AHG 7	Open source software
ISO/IEC JTC 1/SC 7/AHG 9	AI-based software development
ISO/IEC JTC 1/SC 7/AHG 10	Green software
ISO/IEC JTC 1/SC 7/AHG 11	Low code development
Advisory Group	Working Area
ISO/IEC JTC 1/SC 7/AG 1	Chair's Advisory Group
ISO/IEC JTC 1/SC 7/AG 2	Business planning group
ISO/IEC JTC 1/SC 7/AG 3	Communications and outreach
ISO/IEC JTC 1/SC 7/AG 4	Standards management
ISO/IEC JTC 1/SC 7/AG 5	Architecture and future watch

ISO/IEC JTC 1/SC 7 also had one task force, “Spanish Translation Task Force”.

== Collaborations ==
ISO/IEC JTC 1/SC 7 works in close collaboration with a number of other organizations or subcommittees, both internal and external to ISO or IEC, in order to avoid conflicting or duplicative work. Organizations internal to ISO or IEC that collaborate with or are in liaison to ISO/IEC JTC 1/SC 7 include:

- ISO/IEC JTC 1/SC 22, Programming languages, their environments and system software interfaces
- ISO/IEC JTC 1/SC 27, Security techniques
- ISO/IEC JTC 1/SC 32, Data management and interchange
- ISO/IEC JTC 1/SC 38, Cloud Computing and Distributed Platforms
- ISO/IEC JTC 1/SC 40, Service Management and IT Governance
- ISO/TC 22/SC 3, Electrical and electronic equipment
- ISO/TC 22/SC 32, Electrical and electronic components and general system aspects
- ISO/TC 46/SC 4, Technical interoperability
- ISO/TC 159/SC 4, Ergonomics of human-system interaction
- ISO/TC 176, Quality management and quality assurance
- ISO/TC 176/SC 1, Concepts and terminology
- ISO/TC 176/SC 2, Quality systems
- ISO/TC 176/SC 3, Supporting technologies
- ISO/TC 184/SC 4, Industrial data
- ISO/TC 184/SC 5, Interoperability, integration, and architectures for enterprise systems and automation applications
- ISO/TC 210, Quality management and corresponding general aspects for medical devices
- ISO/TC 215, Health informatics
- ISO/PC 251, Asset management
- ISO/TC 258, Project, programme and portfolio management
- ISO/PC 259, Outsourcing
- ISO/CASCO, Committee on conformity assessment
- IEC/TC 56, Dependability
- IEC/TC 93, Design automation

Some organizations external to ISO or IEC that collaborate with or are in liaison to ISO/IEC JTC 1/SC 7 include:

- Audio Engineering Society (AES)
- Ecma International
- Institute of Electrical and Electronics Engineers (IEEE)
- International Council on Systems Engineering (INCOSE)
- Information Systems Audit and Control Association (ISACA/ITGI)
- International Telecommunication Union (ITU)
- Project Management Institute (PMI)
- IT Service Management Forum (itSMF)
- World Meteorological Organization (WMO)
- European Software Institute (ESI software)
- International Association of Information Technology Asset Managers, Inc. (IAITAM)
- The SPICE User Group
- Business Software Alliance (BSA)
- European Telecommunications Standards Institute (ETSI)

== Member countries ==
Countries pay a fee to ISO to be members of subcommittees.

The 40 "P" (participating) members of ISO/IEC JTC 1/SC 7 are: Argentina, Australia, Belgium, Brazil, Canada, China, Costa Rica, Czech Republic, Denmark, Finland, France, Germany, India, Ireland, Israel, Italy, Jamaica, Japan, Kazakhstan, Republic of Korea, Luxembourg, Malaysia, Mexico, Netherlands, New Zealand, Peru, Poland, Portugal, Romania, Russian Federation, Slovakia, South Africa, Spain, Sweden, Switzerland, Thailand, Ukraine, United Kingdom, United States of America, and Uruguay.

The 20 "O" (observing) members of ISO/IEC JTC 1/SC 7 are: Austria, Bosnia and Herzegovina, Chile, Colombia, Cuba, Cyprus, Estonia, Ghana, Hong Kong, Hungary, Iceland, Indonesia, Islamic Republic of Iran, Kenya, Morocco, Norway, Philippines, Serbia, the Republic of Macedonia, and Turkey.

== Published standards ==
ISO/IEC JTC 1/SC 7 currently has 153 published standards within the field of software and systems engineering, including:

ISO/IEC Standard	Title	Status	Description	WG
ISO/IEC TR 19759	Software Engineering – Guide to the Software Engineering Body of Knowledge (SWEBOK)	Published (2005)	Identifies and describes the subset of body of knowledge of software engineering that is generally accepted	20
ISO/IEC 15288	Systems and software engineering – System life cycle processes	Published (2008)	Establishes a common framework for describing the life cycle of systems created by humans and defines a set of processes and associated terminology	7
ISO/IEC 12207	Systems and software engineering – Software life cycle processes	Published (2008)	Establishes a common framework for software life cycle processes with well-defined terminology	7
ISO/IEC 20000-1	Information technology – Service management – Part 1: Service management system requirements	Published (2011)	Specifies requirements for the service provider to plan, establish, implement, operate, monitor, review, maintain, and improve a service management system (SMS)	25
ISO/IEC 15504-1	Information technology – Process assessment – Part 1: Concepts and vocabulary	Published (2004)	Provides overall information on the concepts of process assessment and its use in the two contexts of process improvement and process capability determination	10
ISO/IEC/IEEE 42010	Systems and software engineering – Architecture description	Published (2011)	Addresses the creation, analysis, and sustainment of architectures of systems through the use of architecture descriptions	42
ISO/IEC TR 29110-1	Software engineering – Lifecycle profiles for Very Small Entities (VSEs) – Part 1: Overview	Published (2011)	Introduces the characteristics and requirements of a VSE and clarifies the rationale for VSE-specific profiles, documents, standards, and guides	24
ISO/IEC TR 9126-2	Software engineering – Product quality – Part 2: External metrics	Published (2003)	Provides external metrics for measuring attributes of six external quality characteristics defined in ISO/IEC 9126-1	
ISO/IEC 10746-1	Information technology – Open Distributed Processing – Reference model: Overview	Published (1998)	Provides: An introduction and motivation for ODP; An overview of the Reference Model of Open Distributed Processing (RM-ODP) and an explanation of its key concepts; Gives guidance on the application of RM-ODP	19
ISO/IEC 19770-1	Information technology – Software asset management – Part 1: Processes and tiered assessment of conformance	Published (2012)	Establishes a baseline for an integrated set of processes for Software Asset Management (SAM), divided into tiers to allow for incremental implementation, assessment, and recognition	21
ISO/IEC 24744	Software engineering—Metamodel for development methodologies	Published (2014)	Specifies a metamodel for development methodologies and related information.	19
ISO/IEC/IEEE 26511	Systems and software engineering – Requirements for managers of user documentation	Published (2011)	Specifies procedures for managing user documentation throughout the software life cycle.	2
ISO/IEC/IEEE 26512	Systems and software engineering—Requirements for acquirers and suppliers of user documentation	Published (2011)	Defines the documentation process from the acquirer's standpoint and the supplier's standpoint.	2
ISO/IEC/IEEE 26513	Systems and software engineering – Requirements for testers and reviewers of user documentation	Published (2009)	Defines the process in which user documentation products are tested.	2
ISO/IEC/IEEE 26514	Systems and software engineering – Requirements for designers and developers of user documentation	Published (2008)	Specifies the structure, content, and format for user documentation, and provides informative guidance for user documentation style.	2
ISO/IEC/IEEE 26515	Systems and software engineering – Developing user documentation in an agile environment	Published (2011)	Specifies the way in which user documentation can be developed in agile development projects.	2

== See also ==
- ISO/IEC JTC 1
- List of ISO standards
- Standards Council of Canada
- International Organization for Standardization
- International Electrotechnical Commission
