= ISO/IEC 12207 =

ISO, IEC and IEEE standard for software lifecycle processes

ISO/IEC/IEEE 12207 Systems and software engineering – Software life cycle processes is an international standard for software lifecycle processes. Introduced in 1995, it aims to be a primary standard that defines all the processes required for developing and maintaining software systems, including the outcomes and/or activities of each process.

== Revision history ==
ISO/IEC/IEEE 12207:2026 is the newest version, published in April 2026. The IEEE Computer Society continued to participate directly with ISO/IEC JTC 1/SC 7/WG 7 in the development and editing of this second edition. A significant change is that it adopts a process model identical to the ISO/IEC/IEEE 15288:2015 process model (there is one name change, the 15288 "System Requirements Definition" process is renamed to the "System/Software Requirements Definition" process). This harmonization of the two standards led to the removal of separate software development and software reuse processes, bringing the total number of 43 processes from 12207 down to the 30 processes defined in 15288. It also caused changes to the quality management and quality assurance process activities and outcomes. Additionally, the definition of "audit" and related audit activities were updated. Annex I of ISO/IEC/IEEE 12207:2026 provides a process mapping between the 2026 version and the previous version, including the primary process alignments between the two versions; this is intended to enable traceability and ease transition for users of the previous version.

Prior versions include:

- ISO/IEC 12207:2017, which was published in November 2017
- ISO/IEC 12207:2008, which was published in February 2008
- ISO/IEC 12207:1995/Amd 2:2004, an amended version of the prior, published in November 2004
- ISO/IEC 12207:1995/Amd 1:2002, an amended version of the prior, published in May 2002
- ISO/IEC 12207:1995, the first iteration, published in July 1995; originally was divided into five primary processes (acquisition, supply, development, operation, and maintenance), with eight supporting and four organizational life cycle processes

=== IEEE versions ===
Prior to the IEEE Computer Society formally joining the editing process (becoming a major stakeholder) for the 2017 release, the IEEE maintained its own versions of ISO/IEC 12207, initially with modifications made jointly with the Electronic Industries Alliance (EIA). With the 2008 update came a "shared strategy of ISO/IEC JTC 1/SC 7 and the IEEE to harmonize their respective collections of standards," resulting in identical standards thereon, but with slightly different names. Those IEEE versions included:

- IEEE Std. 12207-2008: "integrates ISO/IEC 12207:1995 with its two amendments and was coordinated with the parallel revision of ISO/IEC 15288:2002 (System life cycle processes) to align structure, terms, and corresponding organizational and project processes"; superseded by ISO/IEC/IEEE 12207:2017
- IEEE/EIA 12207.2-1997: "provides implementation consideration guidance for the normative clauses of IEEE/EIA 12207.0"; superseded/made obsolete by IEEE Std. 12207-2008, which was then superseded by ISO/IEC/IEEE 12207:2017
- IEEE/EIA 12207.1-1997: "provides guidance for recording life cycle data resulting from the life cycle processes of IEEE/EIA 12207.0"; superseded by ISO/IEC/IEEE 15289:2011, which was then superseded by ISO/IEC/IEEE 15289:2017
- IEEE/EIA 12207.0-1996: "consists of the clarifications, additions, and changes [to ISO/IEC 12207:1995 for industry implementation] accepted by the Institute of Electrical and Electronics Engineers (IEEE) and the Electronic Industries Alliance (EIA) as formulated by a joint project of the two organizations"; superseded by IEEE Std. 12207-2008, which was then superseded by ISO/IEC/IEEE 12207:2017

It's also worth noting that IEEE/EIA 12207 officially replaced MIL-STD-498 (released in December 1994) for the development of DoD software systems on May 27, 1998.

== Processes not stages ==
The standard establishes a set of processes for managing the lifecycle of software. The standard "does not prescribe a specific software life cycle model, development methodology, method, modelling approach, or technique.". Instead, the standard (as well as ISO/IEC/IEEE 15288) distinguishes between a "stage" and "process" as follows:

- stage: "period within the life cycle of an entity that relates to the state of its description or realization". A stage is typically a period of time and ends with a "primary decision gate".
- process: "set of interrelated or interacting activities that transforms inputs into outputs". The same process often recurs within different stages.

Stages (a.k.a. phases) are not the same as processes, and this standard only defines specific processes - it does not define any particular stages. Instead, the standard acknowledges that software life cycles vary, and may be divided into stages (also called phases) that represent major life cycle periods and give rise to primary decision gates. No particular set of stages is normative, but it does mention two examples:

- The system life cycle stages from ISO/IEC TS 24748-1 could be used (concept, development, production, utilization, support, and retirement).
- It also notes that a common set of stages for software is concept exploration, development, sustainment, and retirement.

The life cycle processes the standard defines are not aligned to any specific stage in a software life cycle. Indeed, the life cycle processes that involve planning, performance, and evaluation "should be considered for use at every stage". In practice, processes occur whenever they are needed within any stage.

== Processes ==
ISO/IEC/IEEE 12207:2026 divides software life cycle processes into four main process groups: agreement, organizational project-enabling, technical management, and technical processes. Under each of those four process groups are a variety of sub-categories, including the primary activities of acquisition and supply (agreement); configuration (technical management); and operation, maintenance, and disposal (technical).

=== Agreement processes ===
Here ISO/IEC/IEEE 12207:2026 includes the acquisition and supply processes, which are activities related to establishing an agreement between a supplier and acquirer. Acquisition covers all the activities involved in initiating a project. The acquisition phase can be divided into different activities and deliverables that are completed chronologically. During the supply phase a project management plan is developed. This plan contains information about the project such as different milestones that need to be reached.

=== Organizational project-enabling processes ===
Detailed here are life cycle model management, infrastructure management, portfolio management, human resource management, quality management, and knowledge management processes. These processes help a business or organization enable, control, and support the system life cycle and related projects. Life cycle model management helps ensure acquisition and supply efforts are supported, while infrastructure and portfolio management supports business and project-specific initiatives during the entire system life cycle. The rest ensure the necessary resources and quality controls are in place to support the business' project and system endeavors. If an organization does not have an appropriate set of organizational processes, a project executed by the organization may apply those processes directly to the project instead.

=== Technical management processes ===
ISO/IEC/IEEE 12207:2026 places seven different processes here:

- [Project planning]
- Project assessment and control
- Decision management
- Risk management
- Configuration management
- Information management
- Quality Assurance Process

These processes deal with planning, assessment, and control of software and other projects during the life cycle, ensuring quality along the way.

=== Technical processes ===
The technical processes of ISO/IEC/IEEE 12207:2026 encompass 14 different processes, some of which came from the old software-specific processes that were phased out from the 2008 version.

The full list includes:

- Business or mission analysis
- Stakeholder needs and requirements definition
- Systems/Software requirements definition
- Architecture definition
- Design definition
- System analysis
- Implementation
- Integration
- Verification
- Transition
- Validation
- Operation
- Maintenance
- Disposal

These processes involve technical activities and personnel (information technology, troubleshooters, software specialists, etc.) during pre-, post- and during operation. The analysis and definition processes early on set the stage for how software and projects are implemented. Additional processes of integration, verification, transition, and validation help ensure quality and readiness. The operation and maintenance phases occur simultaneously, with the operation phase consisting of activities like assisting users in working with the implemented software product, and the maintenance phase consisting of maintenance tasks to keep the product up and running. The disposal process describes how the system/project will be retired and cleaned up, if necessary.

== Conformance ==
Clause 4 describes the document's intended use and conformance requirements. It is expected that particular projects "may not need to use all of the processes provided by this document." In practice, conforming to this standard normally involves selecting and declaring the set of suitable processes. This can be done through either "full conformance" or "tailored conformance".

"Full conformance" can be claimed in one of two ways. "Full conformance to tasks" can be claimed if all requirements of the declared processes' activities and tasks are met. "Full conformance to outcomes" can be claimed if all required outcomes of the declared processes are met. The latter permits more variation.

"Tailored conformance" may be declared when specific clauses are selected or modified through the tailoring process also defined in the document.

== See also ==
- Software development process
- Software release life cycle
- ISO/IEC/IEEE 15288
- ISO/IEC 15504
- ISO/IEC/IEEE 29119
- ISO/IEC JTC 1/SC 7
- Meta-modeling technique
- V model
- Unified Modeling Language
- Build management
- Release management
