= Identifying and Managing Project Risk =

2003 book by Tom Kendrick

- Hardcover edition (2009)
- Author: Tom Kendrick
- Language: English
- Genre: Business, Project Management, Risk Management
- Publisher: American Management Association
- Publication date: 25 April 2003
- Publication place: United States
- Media type: Print (Hardcover)
- Pages: 335
- ISBN: 0-8144-0761-7
- OCLC: 50803496
- Dewey Decimal: 658.4/04 21
- LC Class: HD61 .K46 2003

Identifying and Managing Project Risk by Tom Kendrick is a book about identifying and managing risks on projects. It was published on April 25, 2003 by the American Management Association.

== Overview ==
Kendrick's coverage of risk, and more prominently uncertainty, is complete in a general fashion focusing a majority of his discussion on risk in projects due to poor planning and change management processes.

He uses a collection of project elements from various projects his clients have conducted. He uses this data, Project Experience Risk Information Library (PERIL) database, to quantify and rank classes of risk. In the early part of his book he uses this significantly and the Appendix lists approximately 120 of the element's descriptions.

The book is structured to follow the PMBOK stages of a project — initiation, planning, controlling, executing and closure. Each chapter discusses a set of concepts and concludes with a bulleted "Key Ideas" section and an anecdote from the two attempts to construct the Panama Canal.

== Reception ==
Critical reception has been positive. Strategic Finance reviewed the book's third edition, praising it as "a great resource for new and experienced project managers because it reflects the most recent changes to the Guide to the Project Management Body of Knowledge (PMBOK® Guide) from the Project Management Institute." The Quality Management Journal also wrote a favorable review for the work, which they felt was "insightful".
