= ISO/IEC 33001 =

ISO/IEC 33001 Information technology - Process assessment - Concepts and terminology is a set of technical standards documents for the computer software development process and related business management functions.

ISO/IEC 33001:2015 is a revision of ISO/IEC 15504, also termed Software Process Improvement and Capability Determination (SPICE).

The ISO/IEC 330xx family superseded the ISO/IEC 155xx family.
