= Service integration and management =

Management of multiple services

Service integration and management (SIAM) is an approach to managing multiple suppliers of services (business services as well as information technology services) and integrating them to provide a single business-facing IT organization. It aims at seamlessly integrating interdependent services from various internal and external service providers into end-to-end services to meet business requirements. The Scopism SIAM Body of Knowledge defines SIAM as "a management methodology that is used to create value in can be applied in an ecosystem where multiple service providers are involved in the delivery of services."

== Background ==
Sourcing information technology capabilities and capacity from multiple external suppliers is becoming a dominant operating model for many large IT organizations. This model is commonly known as multisourcing.

Sourcing from multiple suppliers allows an organization to maintain in-house technical teams or large single source suppliers, and become more adaptable by taking advantage of competitive marketplace behaviors which incentivise cost reduction and leverage innovation. The use of multiple suppliers can incur large management overhead costs and lead to difficulty in managing end to end (E2E) services. SIAM thinking has developed to aid that management challenge. It has expanded beyond IT services to be used for many distinct types of business service.

The term SIAM was predated by the term Service Integration which has been in use since at least 2009. It should not be confused with the term System integration.

In UK government, it is seen as a way for large governmental IT organisations to better manage and control multi-sourced operations, by compiling (and then sharing between themselves) their best practices and their most successful management methods.

According to the SIAM Body of Knowledge, the term ‘service integration and management’ or SIAM, and the concept of SIAM as a management methodology originated in around 2005 from within the UK public sector, which was also the source of other best practice methodologies such as ITIL®.

The methodology was initially designed for the Department for Work and Pensions to obtain better value for money from services delivered by multiple service providers, and specifically to separate service integration capabilities from systems integration and IT service provision.

This new approach reduced the duplication of activities in the service providers, and introduced the concept of a ‘service integrator’. This new service integration capability provided governance and coordination to encourage service providers to work together to drive down costs and improve service quality.

SIAM is an area of service management, and one that is associated with multiple disciplines including IT service management, enterprise architecture, organisational change management, quality management, and risk management.

In 2016, Scopism, a management consultancy, worked with a team of experts from companies and independents including Atos, TCS and Sopra Steria to create the SIAM Foundation Body of Knowledge. This BoK is available for free download from the Scopism website. It is linked to the global SIAM training and certification scheme launched by EXIN, a Dutch certification organisation and Scopism. The SIAM Foundation BoK was then followed by the SIAM Professional BoK in 2017 and the associated SIAM Professional certification. In 2019, the SIAM Foundation and Professional BoKs were revised to reflect changes in the SIAM and IT management landscape, including the publication of COBIT 2019 and ITIL 4.

== Key concepts ==
The SIAM Foundation Body of Knowledge (BoK) from Scopism Ltd defines SIAM as ″a management methodology that can be applied in an environment that includes services sourced from a number of service providers″.

The SIAM Foundation Body of Knowledge also introduces the four most common SIAM structures:

- Internal service integrator
- External service integrator
- Hybrid service integrator
- Lead supplier as service integrator

The SIAM Foundation BoK also introduces other SIAM key concepts:

- SIAM ecosystem: made of up three layers – the customer organization, the service integrator, and service providers
- SIAM practices: addressing people, process, measurement and technology
- SIAM structural elements: including boards, process forums and working groups

SIAM introduces some of the following key concepts for effective Service Management:

- Return On Value (ROV): Since SIAM provides both tangible and intangible benefits, ROV become a key for measuring the benefits that SIAM provides.
- Total Cost Of Consumption (TCC): With SIAM being a consumer of services, Total Cost Of Ownership (TCO) loses its relevancy to a certain extent as the cost an organization incurs for consuming any service from a service provider cannot be measured using TCO. This is where TCC is useful. TCC reflects the cost that organization incurs during the life of a service that it has sourced from a service provider.
- SIAM Knowledge Management System (SIAMKMS): A number of management and information systems constitutes SIAMKMS.
- Federated Knowledge Management: With knowledge being sourced from a number of providers (both internal as well as external), management of this distributed set becomes critical. Distributed Knowledge Management (through federated knowledge base) gains prominence.

== IT capabilities ==
In order to perform effective and efficient service integration and management, multi-sourcing clients require key IT capabilities. They need to build and continuously improve these capabilities for performing successful service integration and management. In total, research identifies six key IT capabilities that clients should build and optimize.

1. Manage service integration governance: Multi-sourcing organizations need to be able to define, establish and continuously adapt the service integration governance.
2. Manage the service integration organization: Multi-sourcing organizations need to be able to develop and manage the distributed organization in accordance with changing business requirements.
3. Manage the business: Multi-sourcing organizations need to be able to manage business demand and develop a service portfolio in alignment with business requirements.
4. Manage tools and information: Multi-sourcing organizations need to be able to manage distributed information and the integration tool solutions.
5. Manage providers and contracts: Multi-sourcing organizations need to be able to select an appropriate provider portfolio and to manage the providers according to the outsourcing contracts
6. Manage end-to-end services: Multi-sourcing organizations need to be able to understand and manage the business services end-to-end. This includes consolidation of business as well as IT services especially during mergers & acquisitions and demergers & spinoffs. Integral part is IT service management including relevant processes.

A conscious and systematic implementation of these capabilities should contribute to the effectiveness of multi-sourcing engagements and overall multi-sourcing success.

== Issues, benefits, and implementation challenges ==
When services are provided by multiple teams or suppliers, coordinating delivery to the organization can be challenging. Effective operational and commercial governance is considered important for maintaining consistent service outcomes.

According to research, service integration and management needs to address and overcome four key issues:

1. Measuring services end-to-end
2. Aligning scope and specifications across provider contracts
3. Managing relationships and collaboration with and between providers
4. Defining standardization and modularization

Service integration and management functions have to manage these key issues in order to prevent common issues with SIAM and realize its key benefits.

Some common issues include:

- Individual teams (both in-house and outsourced) can act autonomously and lack coordination.
- Individual suppliers fulfilling their contractual obligations does not provide assurance that the end to end service delivered to the enterprise will be acceptable
- Fragmentation can complicate the tasks of integration and governance, both of which are essential to delivering effective services to a business or organisation.
- Individual suppliers can focus on attributing blame rather than identifying and addressing the root cause of service quality issues.

The SIAM BoK claims that some key benefits of moving to a well managed multisourced IT organisation can include:

- Ease of obtaining additional resources "on tap".
- Increased adaptability and speed of response to business requirements.
- Competition between suppliers to drive down costs and increase quality.
- Widening the portfolio of services and skills available to the organisation.
- Decreased time to market, with increased innovation and business to IT alignment.
- Allowing the retained organisation to focus on IT strategy, business relationship management, enterprise architecture, and governance.
- Having the ability to utilise suppliers who are either best-of-breed or specialists, experts in niche technologies, or who can bring individual strengths to specific service offerings.

SIAM aims to bring the desired governance and control which will ensure organisational policies and standards are not ignored or inconsistently applied; and suppliers act in a cohesive and efficient manner.

Challenges in implementation

SIAM is beneficial for organizations outsourcing their key functions and services but SIAM Implementation faces multiple challenges:

- Alignment of Service Level Agreements is biggest challenge in SIAM as whenever an organization signs contracts with one vendor they look only specifics and current requirement. Overall SLA and Contractual alignment is biggest challenge in SIAM.
- Blame Game is still an issue. SIAM functions as a neutral party but when issues crops up vendors blame each other and finding a common ground is a challenge.
- Ownership is often not defined. Root cause identification and decision making for solution deployment spreads across the organizations and lack ownership. SIAM implementation can be only fruitful if certain level of decision making is inbuilt within SIAM.
- SIAM aims to remove the gaps in communication but the communication gap is often seen as a challenge in a multi-sourcing environment.

== Organisational structure ==
The creation of a service integration team, which acts as the single point of accountability and orchestrate multiple suppliers, is seen as an effective way of minimizing or mitigating potential multisourcing issues, and optimising the composite IT organisation.

A SIAM function, department or team will typically:

- Manage the multiple suppliers to give the optimal mix of flexibility, innovation, standard and consistent service.
- Be accountable for the integrated services that are being delivered back to the business.
- Specify IT service management processes and procedures to be deployed across the enterprise and ensure they are followed.
- Act as the central point of control between IT demand and IT supply.
- Play a pivotal coordinating role in all service management processes.

Examples of specific activities that a SIAM team would undertake include: assessing changes to the infrastructure and applications; managing the resolution of incidents which affect a service supported by multiple service providers; and coordinating disaster recovery. In addition, a SIAM team would act as the gatekeeper by enforcing change, security accreditation, testing and release processes.

Four different organizational models exist to institutionalize service integration and management in multi-sourcing settings with interdependent services. The models describe the position of the organizational unit that is performing service integration and management:

1. Internal service integrator: The client itself can take responsibility for service integration. Its retained organization is accountable for coordinating and integrating the services.
2. Lead supplier as service integrator: One of the clients's existing service providers is responsible for service integration in addition to its original service delivery responsibilities.
3. External service integrator: An independent third-party company is responsible for service integration without additional service delivery responsibilities.
4. Hybrid service integrator: Service integration responsibilities are distributed across the client and one of their service providers.

Prime vendor, where one organisation sub-contracts services to external service providers is not a SIAM structure, although it requires similar capabilities. The service integrator in a SIAM model will not typically hold contractual relationships with the service providers.

Hence, a key feature of the SIAM approach is that the SIAM team might itself be sourced either entirely or in part from a supplier. Whilst it might be considered beneficial from a governance perspective for that supplier to have no other commercial interest in the provision of IT services to the customer in practice the SIAM provider is often the supplier with the largest contract value. In theory this means that they have the greatest interest in delivering a good service.

== ITIL and SIAM ==
ITIL processes and capabilities provide a strong foundation for implementing SIAM because they cover the lifecycle of IT services, and the terminology is recognized and understood by most IT suppliers. ITIL, therefore, provides a strong platform and common language with which a SIAM team can manage and work with a full spectrum of suppliers. SIAM draws on other sources of best practice as well in specific domain areas, for instance COBIT5 and ISO/IEC 38500. Whilst ITIL provides high level guidance on many aspects of IT management relevant to SIAM it does not currently do so in the context of a multi-supplier eco-system. Axelos, the current owners of ITIL have published several white papers on SIAM.

In an organisational ecosystem using processes based on ITIL, SIAM capabilities are needed to align processes across service providers.

ITIL is less applicable in situations where SIAM is being applied to non-IT services.

The SIAM Process Guides, published by Scopism Ltd and available as a free download, explains how to adapt service management processes in a multi-supplier environment.

== Global adoption ==
SIAM has been adopted by organizations in many different countries. The 2021 Global SIAM Survey published by Scopism Ltd had respondents from 32 countries. India provided the most responses, followed by the UK, Australia, the Netherlands and the USA. Anecdotal evidence suggests that SIAM is more mature in Europe, Japan and Australia than in North America. According to the certification institute EXIN, SIAM certifications have been taken in over 21 countries since the certification program’s launch in 2017.

SIAM practitioners later begin to host Service North. Service North is a global SIAM conference that has been taking place since 2018. Initially held in the UK, the 2021 and 2022 events were virtual, with attendees from around the world.
