= ISO/IEC 15288 =

Systems engineering standard on processes and lifecycle stages

The ISO/IEC 15288 Systems and software engineering — System life cycle processes is a technical standard in systems engineering which covers processes and lifecycle stages, developed by the International Organization for Standardization (ISO) and the International Electrotechnical Commission (IEC). Planning for the ISO/IEC 15288:2002(E) standard started in 1994 when the need for a common systems engineering process framework was recognized.

ISO/IEC/IEEE 15288 is managed by ISO/IEC JTC1/SC7, which is the committee responsible for developing standards in the area of Software and Systems Engineering. ISO/IEC/IEEE 15288 is part of the SC 7 Integrated set of Standards, and other standards in this domain include:

- ISO/IEC TR 15504 which addresses capability
- ISO/IEC 12207 and ISO/IEC 15288 which address lifecycle and
- ISO 9001 & ISO 90003 which address quality

== History ==
The previously accepted standard MIL STD 499A (1974) was cancelled after a memo from the United States Secretary of Defense (SECDEF) prohibited the use of most U.S. Military Standards without a waiver (this memo was rescinded in 2005). The first edition was issued on 1 November 2002. Stuart Arnold was the editor and Harold Lawson was the architect of the standard. In 2004 this standard was adopted by the Institute of Electrical and Electronics Engineers as IEEE 15288. ISO/IEC 15288 was updated in 2008, then again (as a joint publication with IEEE) in 2015 and 2023.

- ISO/IEC/IEEE 15288:2023, 16 May 2023
- Revises: ISO/IEC/IEEE 15288:2015 (jointly with IEEE), 15 May 2015
- Revises: ISO/IEC 15288:2008 (harmonized with ISO/IEC 12207:2008), 1 February 2008
- Revises: ISO/IEC 15288:2002 (first edition), 1 November 2002

== Processes ==
The standard defines thirty processes grouped into four categories:

- Agreement processes
- Organizational project-enabling processes
- Technical management processes
- Technical processes

The standard defines two agreement processes:

- Acquisition process (clause 6.1.1)
- Supply process (clause 6.1.2)

The standard defines six organizational project-enabling processes:

- Life cycle model management process (clause 6.2.1)
- Infrastructure management process (clause 6.2.2)
- Portfolio management process (clause 6.2.3)
- Human resources management process (clause 6.2.4)
- Quality management process (clause 6.2.5)
- Knowledge management process (clause 6.2.6)

The standard defines eight technical management processes:

- Project planning process (clause 6.3.1)
- Project assessment and control process (clause 6.3.2)
- Decision management process (clause 6.3.3)
- Risk management process (clause 6.3.4)
- Configuration management process (clause 6.3.5)
- Information management process (clause 6.3.6)
- Measurement process (clause 6.3.7)
- Quality assurance process (clause 6.3.8)

The standard defines fourteen technical processes:

- Business or mission analysis process (clause 6.4.1)
- Stakeholder needs and requirements definition process (clause 6.4.2)
- System requirements definition process (clause 6.4.3)
- Architecture definition process (clause 6.4.4)
- Design definition process (clause 6.4.5)
- System analysis process (clause 6.4.6)
- Implementation process (clause 6.4.7)
- Integration process (clause 6.4.8)
- Verification process (clause 6.4.9)
- Transition process (clause 6.4.10)
- Validation process (clause 6.4.11)
- Operation process (clause 6.4.12)
- Maintenance process (clause 6.4.13)
- Disposal process (clause 6.4.14)

Each process is defined by a purpose, outcomes and activities. Activities are further divided into tasks.

== See also ==
- Systems development life cycle
- System lifecycle
- Capability Maturity Model Integration (CMMI)
- ISO/IEC 12207
- Concept of operations or CONOPS
