= List of ISO standards 1–1999 =

This is a list of published (Note: This list generally excludes draft versions.) International Organization for Standardization (ISO) standards and other deliverables. (Note: ISO deliverables include "specifications" (ISO/PAS, ISO/TS), "reports" (ISO/TR), etc, which are not referred to by ISO as "standards".) For a complete and up-to-date list of all the ISO standards, see the ISO catalogue.

The standards are protected by copyright and most of them must be purchased. However, about 300 of the standards produced by ISO and IEC's Joint Technical Committee 1 (JTC 1) have been made freely and publicly available.

== ISO 1 – ISO 199 ==
- ISO 1:2022 Geometrical product specifications (GPS) — Standard reference temperature for the specification of geometrical and dimensional properties
- ISO GUIDE 1:1972 Presentation of International Standards and technical reports [Withdrawn without replacement]
- IWA 1:2005 Quality management systems — Guidelines for process improvements in health service organizations [Withdrawn without replacement]
- ISO 2:1973 Textiles — Designation of the direction of twist in yarns and related products
- ISO/IEC GUIDE 2:2004 Standardization and related activities — General vocabulary
- IWA 2:2007 Quality management systems — Guidelines for the application of ISO 9001:2000 in education [Withdrawn without replacement]
- ISO 3:1973 Preferred numbers — Series of preferred numbers
- IWA 3:2005 Image safety — Reducing the incidence of undesirable biomedical effects caused by visual image sequences [Withdrawn without replacement]
- ISO/IEC GUIDE 3:1981 Identification of national standards that are equivalent to International Standards [Withdrawn: replaced with ISO/IEC GUIDE 21:1999, now ISO/IEC GUIDE 21-1:2005 and ISO/IEC GUIDE 21-2:2005]
- ISO 4:1997 Information and documentation — Rules for the abbreviation of title words and titles of publications
- ISO GUIDE 4:1975 Preparation of standard methods of measuring performance of consumer goods (SMMP) [Withdrawn: replaced with ISO/IEC GUIDE 36:1982, now Withdrawn without replacement]
- IWA 4:2009 Quality management systems — Guidelines for the application of ISO 9001:2008 in local government [Withdrawn: replaced with ISO 18091:2014, now ISO 18091:2019]
- ISO 5 Photography and graphic technology — Density measurements
  - ISO 5-1:2009 Part 1: Geometry and functional notation
  - ISO 5-2:2009 Part 2: Geometric conditions for transmittance density
  - ISO 5-3:2009 Part 3: Spectral conditions
  - ISO 5-4:2009 Part 4: Geometric conditions for reflection density
- IWA 5:2006 Emergency preparedness [Withdrawn without replacement]
- ISO GUIDE 5:1976 Designation of internationally standardized items [Withdrawn without replacement]
- ISO 6:1993 Photography — Black-and-white pictorial still camera negative film/process systems — Determination of ISO speed
- IWA 6:2008 Guidelines for the management of drinking water utilities under crisis conditions [Withdrawn without replacement]
- ISO GUIDE 6:1977 Mention of reference materials in International Standards [Withdrawn without replacement]
- ISO 7:Pipe threads where pressure-tight joints are made on the threads
  - ISO 7-1:1994 Part 1: Dimensions, tolerances and designation
    - ISO 7-1:1994/COR 1:2007 Technical Corrigendum 1
  - ISO 7-2:2000 Part 2: Verification by means of limit gauges
- ISO/IEC GUIDE 7:1994 Guidelines for drafting of standards suitable for use for conformity assessment [Withdrawn: replaced with ISO/IEC 17007:2009]
- ISO 8:2019 Information and documentation — Presentation and identification of periodicals. For the 8-bit coded character set, see ISO/IEC 8859
- ISO GUIDE 8:1977 Guidelines for a national standards information centre [Withdrawn without replacement]
- IWA 8:2009 Tableware, giftware, jewellery, luminaries — Glass clarity — Classification and test method [Withdrawn without replacement]
- ISO 9:1995 Information and documentation — Transliteration of Cyrillic characters into Latin characters — Slavic and non-Slavic languages
- ISO GUIDE 9:1976 Courses in standardization [Withdrawn without replacement]
- IWA 9:2011 Framework for managing sustainable development in business districts [Withdrawn without replacement]
- ISO/R 10:1955 Aircraft — Ground air-conditioning connections for pressure cabins [Withdrawn: replaced with ISO 1034]
- ISO GUIDE 10:1977 Registration of standardizing bodies [Withdrawn without replacement]
- ISO 11:1987 Aircraft — Ground pressure testing connections for pressure cabins
- ISO 12:1987 Aerospace — Pipelines — Identification
- ISO 13:1978 Grey iron pipes, special castings and grey iron parts for pressure main lines [Withdrawn without replacement]
- ISO 14:1982 Straight-sided splines for cylindrical shafts with internal centering — Dimensions, tolerances and verification
- ISO 15:2017 Rolling bearings — Radial bearings — Boundary dimensions, general plan
- ISO 16:1975 Acoustics — Standard tuning frequency (Standard musical pitch)
- ISO 17:1973 Guide to the use of preferred numbers and of series of preferred numbers
- ISO 18:1981 Documentation — Contents list of periodicals
- ISO/R 19:1956 Shipbuilding — Inland navigation — Deckbolts [Withdrawn without replacement]
- ISO/R 20:1956 Shipbuilding — Inland navigation — Rivets for Hatches [Withdrawn without replacement]
- ISO 21:1985 Shipbuilding — Inland navigation — Cable-lifters for stud-link anchor chains [Withdrawn without replacement]
- ISO 22:1991 Belt drives — Flat transmission belts and corresponding pulleys — Dimensions and tolerances
- ISO 23:1993 Cinematography — Camera usage of 35 mm motion-picture film — Specifications
- ISO/R 24:1956 Cinematography — Projector usage of 35 mm motion-picture films for direct front projection — Specifications [Withdrawn: replaced with ISO 2939]
- ISO 25:1994 Cinematography — Camera usage of 16 mm motion-picture film — Specifications
- ISO 26:1993 Cinematography — Projector usage of 16 mm motion-picture films for direct front projection — Specifications
- ISO/R 27:1956 Cinematography — Emulsion and sound record positions in camera for 16 mm motion-picture films [Withdrawn without replacement]
- ISO 28:1976 Cinematography — Camera usage of 8 mm Type R motion-picture film — Specifications
- ISO 29:1980 Cinematography — Projector usage of 8 mm Type R silent motion-picture film for direct front projection — Specifications [Withdrawn without replacement]
- ISO/R 30:1956 Bibliographical strip [Withdrawn without replacement]
- ISO 31:Quantities and units [Withdrawn: replaced with ISO/IEC 80000]
- ISO 32:1977 Gas cylinders for medical use — Marking for identification of content
- ISO/R 33:1957 Rubber, vulcanized or thermoplastic — Du Pont constant load method of measuring abrasion resistance of vulcanized natural and synthetic rubbers [Withdrawn without replacement]
- ISO 34 Rubber, vulcanized or thermoplastic — Determination of tear strength measuring abrasion resistance of vulcanized natural and synthetic rubbers
  - ISO 34-1:2022 Part 1: Trouser, angle and crescent test pieces
  - ISO 34-2:2022 Part 2: Small (Delft) test pieces
- ISO 35:2004 Natural rubber latex concentrate — Determination of mechanical stability
- ISO 36:2020 Rubber, vulcanized or thermoplastic — Determination of adhesion to textile fabrics
- ISO 37:2017 Rubber, vulcanized or thermoplastic — Determination of tensile stress-strain properties
- ISO/R 38:1957 Shipbuilding — Bollards [Withdrawn without replacement]
- ISO/R 39:1957 Shipbuilding — Anchor Chains — Lugless Joining Shackles [Withdrawn: replaced with ISO 1704]
- ISO/R 40:1957 Shipbuilding — Anchor Chains — Studless Links [Withdrawn: replaced with ISO 1704]
- ISO 41:1980 Shipbuilding — Inland vessels — Covers for deck openings for pumps [Withdrawn without replacement]
- ISO/R 42:1957 Shipbuilding — Inland vessels — Mushroom-type ventilator heads [Withdrawn: replaced by ISO 3372, now withdrawn without replacement]
- ISO 43:2016 Aircraft — Jacking pads
- ISO 44:1975 Aerospace — Lever-operated, two-position, ON/OFF switches — Directions of operation [Withdrawn without replacement]
- ISO 45:1990 Aircraft — Pressure refuelling connections
- ISO 46:1973 Aircraft — Fuel nozzle grounding plugs and sockets
- ISO/R 47:1957 Aircraft — Toilet connections [Withdrawn: replaced with ISO 17775]
- ISO 48 Rubber, vulcanized or thermoplastic — Determination of hardness
  - ISO 48-1:2018 Part 1: Introduction and guidance
  - ISO 48-2:2018 Part 2: Hardness between 10 IRHD and 100 IRHD
  - ISO 48-3:2018 Part 3: Dead-load hardness using the very low rubber hardness (VLRH) scale
  - ISO 48-4:2018 Part 4: Indentation hardness by durometer method (Shore hardness)
  - ISO 48-5:2018 Part 5: Indentation hardness by IRHD pocket meter method
  - ISO 48-6:2018 Part 6: Apparent hardness of rubber-covered rollers by IRHD method
  - ISO 48-7:2018 Part 7: Apparent hardness of rubber-covered rollers by Shore-type durometer method
  - ISO 48-8:2018 Part 8: Apparent hardness of rubber-covered rollers by Pusey and Jones method
  - ISO 48-9:2018 Part 9: Calibration and verification of hardness testers
- ISO 49:1994 Malleable cast iron fittings threaded to ISO 7-1
- ISO 50:1977 Metal pipes — Steel sockets screwed according to ISO 7 [Withdrawn without replacement]
- ISO/R 51:1957 Shipbuilding — Inland navigation — Pipe lines for the transport of combustible liquids — nominal diameters [Withdrawn without replacement]
- ISO/R 52:1957 Belt drives — Grooved pulleys — Sections A, B, C, D, and E [Withdrawn: replaced by ISO 4183]
- ISO 53:1998 Cylindrical gears for general and heavy engineering — Standard basic rack tooth profile
- ISO 54:1996 Cylindrical gears for general engineering and for heavy engineering — Modules
- ISO 55:1977 Seedlac — Specification [Withdrawn without replacement]
- ISO 56:1979 Shellac — Specification [Withdrawn without replacement]
  - ISO 56-1:1979 Hand-made Shellac — Specification [Withdrawn without replacement]
  - ISO 56-2:1979 Machine-made Shellac — Specification [Withdrawn without replacement]
- ISO 57:1975 Bleached lac — Specification [Withdrawn without replacement]
- ISO/R 58:1958 Substances of paper [Withdrawn without replacement]
- ISO 59:1976 Plastics — Determination of acetone-soluble matter [Withdrawn without replacement]
- ISO 60:1977 Plastics — Determination of apparent density of material that can be poured from a specified funnel
- ISO 61:1976 Plastics — Determination of apparent density of moulding material that cannot be poured from a specified funnel
- ISO 62:2008 Plastics — Determination of water absorption
- ISO 63:1975 Flat transmission belts — Lengths [Withdrawn: Replaced with ISO 22]
- ISO 64:1974 Steel tubes — Outside Diameters [Withdrawn: Replaced with ISO 4200]
- ISO 65:1981 Carbon steel tubes suitable for screwing in accordance with ISO 7-1 [Withdrawn without replacement]
- ISO/R 66:1958 Paper vocabulary — First series of terms [Withdrawn: Replaced with ISO 4046]
- ISO 67:1981 Muscovite mica blocks, thins and films — Grading by size [Withdrawn without replacement]
- ISO 68 ISO general-purpose screw threads – Basic profile
  - ISO 68-1:1998 Part 1: Metric screw threads
  - ISO 68-2:1998 Part 2: Inch screw threads
- ISO 69:1998 Cinematography — 16 mm motion-picture and magnetic film — Cutting and perforating dimensions
- ISO 70:1981 Cinematography — 35 mm negative photographic sound record on 35 mm motion-picture film — Position and maximum width dimensions
- ISO 71:2014 Cinematography — 16 mm negative photographic sound record on 16 mm, 35/16 mm and 35/32 mm motion-picture film — Positions and dimensions
- ISO/R 72:1958 Cinematography — Sound records and scanning area of 35 mm double width push-pull sound prints — Normal and offset centerline types [Withdrawn without replacement]
- ISO/R 73:1958 Cinematography — Image area produced by camera aperture and maximum projectable image area on 35 mm motion-picture film — Positions and dimensions [Withdrawn: replaced by ISO 2906 and ISO 2907]
- ISO 74:1976 Cinematography — Image area produced by camera aperture and maximum projectable image area on 8 mm Type R motion-picture film — Positions and dimensions
- ISO 75 Plastics — Determination of temperature of deflection under load
  - ISO 75-1:2020 Part 1: General test method
  - ISO 75-2:2013 Part 2: Plastics and ebonite
  - ISO 75-3:2004 Part 3: High-strength thermosetting laminates and long-fibre-reinforced plastics
- ISO 76:2006 Rolling bearings — Static load ratings
- ISO/R 77:1958 Bibliographical references — Essential elements [Withdrawn without replacement]
- ISO 78 Chemistry — Layouts for standards (Note: The exact wording of this title varies between parts. This is the wording of the most recently published part.)
  - ISO 78-2:1999 Part 2: Methods of chemical analysis
  - ISO 78-3:1983 Part 3: Standard for molecular absorption spectrometry [Withdrawn without replacement]
  - ISO 78-4:1983 Part 4: Standard for atomic absorption spectrometric analysis [Withdrawn without replacement]
- ISO/R 79:1968 Steel — Brinell hardness test [Withdrawn: replaced with ISO 6506-1 and ISO 6506-4]
- ISO/TR 79:2015 Reference materials – Examples of reference materials for qualitative properties
- ISO/R 80:1968 Steel — Rockwell hardness test (B and C scales) [Withdrawn: replaced with ISO 6508]
- ISO/R 81:1967 Steel — Vickers hardness test (Load 5 to 100 kgf) [Withdrawn: replaced with ISO 6507-1 and ISO 6507-4]
- ISO 82:1974 Steel — Tensile testing [Withdrawn: replaced with ISO 6892-1]
- ISO 83:1976 Steel — Charpy impact test (U-notch) [Withdrawn: replaced with ISO 148-1]
- ISO/R 84:1959 Steel — Izod impact test [Withdrawn without replacement]
- ISO/R 85:1959 Steel — Bend test [Withdrawn: replaced with ISO 7438]
- ISO 86:1974 Steel — Tensile testing of sheet and strip less than 3 mm and not less than 0,5 mm thick [Withdrawn: replaced with ISO 6892-1]
- ISO/R 87:1959 Steel — Simple bend testing of sheet and strip less than 3 mm thick [Withdrawn: replaced with ISO 7438]
- ISO/R 88:1959 Steel — Reverse bend testing of sheet and strip less than 3 mm thick [Withdrawn: replaced with ISO 7799]
- ISO 89:1974 Steel — Tensile testing of wire [Withdrawn: replaced with ISO 6892-1]
- ISO 90 Light gauge metal containers — Definitions and determination of dimensions and capacities
  - ISO 90-1:1997 Part 1: Open-top cans
  - ISO 90-2:1997 Part 2: General use containers
  - ISO 90-3:2000 Part 3: Aerosol cans
- ISO 91:2017 Petroleum and related products — Temperature and pressure volume correction factors (petroleum measurement tables) and standard reference conditions
- ISO 92:1976 Textile machinery and accessories — Spinning machinery — Definition of side (left or right)
- ISO 93 Textile machinery and accessories — Cylindrical sliver cans
  - ISO 93-1:2006 Part 1: Main dimensions
  - ISO 93-2:2006 Part 2: Spring bottoms
  - ISO 93-3:1981 Part 3: Packaging sliver cans (press cans) [Withdrawn without replacement]
- ISO 94:1982 Textile machinery and accessories — Spindle gauges for ring-spinning and ring-doubling frames
- ISO/R 95:1972 Textile machinery and accessories — Rings for ring-spinning and ring-doubling frames for "C" travellers [Withdrawn without replacement]
- ISO 96 Textile machinery and accessories — Rings and travellers for ring spinning and ring twisting frames
  - ISO 96-1:2016 Part 1: Flange rings T and SF and their travellers
  - ISO 96-2:2009 Part 2: HZ- and J-rings and their travellers
- ISO 97:1975 Textile machinery and accessories — Rings for spinning, doubling and twisting for ear-shaped travellers [Withdrawn: replaced with ISO 96-2]
- ISO 98:2001 Textile machinery and accessories — Spinning preparatory and spinning machinery — Main dimensions of coverings for top rollers
- ISO 99:1975 Pulleys for flat transmission belts — Diameters [Withdrawn: replaced with ISO 22]
- ISO 100:1984 Pulleys for flat transmission belts — Crowns [Withdrawn: replaced with ISO 22]
- ISO/R 101:1959 Width of sheets of paper [Withdrawn without replacement]
- ISO 102:1990 Aircraft — Gravity filling orifices
- ISO/R 103:1959 Aircraft — Instrument Cases — Sizes and mounting dimensions [Withdrawn without replacement]
- ISO 104:2015 Rolling bearings — Thrust bearings — Boundary dimensions, general plan
- ISO 105 Textiles — Tests for colour fastness
  - ISO 105-A01:2010 Part A01: General principles of testing
  - ISO 105-A02:1993 Part A02: Grey scale for assessing change in colour
  - ISO 105-A03:2019 Part A03: Grey scale for assessing staining
  - ISO 105-A04:1989 Part A04: Method for the instrumental assessment of the degree of staining of adjacent fabrics
  - ISO 105-A05:1996 Part A05: Instrumental assessment of change in colour for determination of grey scale rating
  - ISO 105-A06:1995 Part A06: Instrumental determination of 1/1 standard depth of colour
  - ISO 105-A08:2001 Part A08: Vocabulary used in colour measurement
  - ISO 105-A11:2012 Part A11: Determination of colour fastness grades by digital imaging techniques
  - ISO 105-B01:2014 Part B01: Colour fastness to light: Daylight
  - ISO 105-B02:2014 Part B02: Colour fastness to artificial light: Xenon arc fading lamp test
  - ISO 105-B03:2017 Part B03: Colour fastness to weathering: Outdoor exposure
  - ISO 105-B04:1994 Part B04: Colour fastness to artificial weathering: Xenon arc fading lamp test
  - ISO 105-B05:1993 Part B05: Detection and assessment of photochromism
  - ISO 105-B06:2020 Part B06: Colour fastness and ageing to artificial light at high temperatures: Xenon arc fading lamp test
  - ISO 105-B07:2009 Part B07: Colour fastness to light of textiles wetted with artificial perspiration
  - ISO 105-B08:1995 Part B08: Quality control of blue wool reference materials 1 to 7
  - ISO 105-B10:2011 Part B10: Artificial weathering — Exposure to filtered xenon-arc radiation
  - ISO 105-C01:1989 Part C01: Colour fastness to washing: Test 1 [Withdrawn: replaced with ISO 105-C10]
  - ISO 105-C02:1989 Part C02: Colour fastness to washing: Test 2 [Withdrawn: replaced with ISO 105-C10]
  - ISO 105-C03:1989 Part C03: Colour fastness to washing: Test 3 [Withdrawn: replaced with ISO 105-C10]
  - ISO 105-C04:1989 Part C04: Colour fastness to washing: Test 4 [Withdrawn: replaced with ISO 105-C10]
  - ISO 105-C05:1989 Part C05: Colour fastness to washing: Test 5 [Withdrawn: replaced with ISO 105-C10]
  - ISO 105-C06:2010 Part C06: Colour fastness to domestic and commercial laundering
  - ISO 105-C07:1999 Part C07: Colour fastness to wet scrubbing of pigment printed textiles
  - ISO 105-C08:2010 Part C08: Colour fastness to domestic and commercial laundering using a non-phosphate reference detergent incorporating a low-temperature bleach activator
  - ISO 105-C09:2001 Part C09: Colour fastness to domestic and commercial laundering — Oxidative bleach response using a non-phosphate reference detergent incorporating a low temperature bleach activator
  - ISO 105-C10:2006 Part C10: Colour fastness to washing with soap or soap and soda
  - ISO 105-C12:2004 Part C12: Colour fastness to industrial laundering
  - ISO 105-D01:2010 Part D01: Colour fastness to drycleaning using perchloroethylene solvent
  - ISO 105-D02:2016 Part D02: Colour fastness to rubbing: Organic solvents
  - ISO 105-E01:2013 Part E01: Colour fastness to water
  - ISO 105-E02:2013 Part E02: Colour fastness to sea water
  - ISO 105-E03:2010 Part E03: Colour fastness to chlorinated water (swimming-pool water)
  - ISO 105-E04:2013 Part E04: Colour fastness to perspiration
  - ISO 105-E05:2010 Part E05: Colour fastness to spotting: Acid
  - ISO 105-E06:2006 Part E06: Colour fastness to spotting: Alkali
  - ISO 105-E07:2010 Part E07: Colour fastness to spotting: Water
  - ISO 105-E08:1994 Part E08: Colour fastness to hot water
  - ISO 105-E09:2010 Part E09: Colour fastness to potting
  - ISO 105-E10:1994 Part E10: Colour fastness to decatizing
  - ISO 105-E11:1994 Part E11: Colour fastness to steaming
  - ISO 105-E12:2010 Part E12: Colour fastness to milling: Alkaline milling
  - ISO 105-E13:1994 Part E13: Colour fastness to acid-felting: Severe
  - ISO 105-E14:1994 Part E14: Colour fastness to acid-felting: Mild
  - ISO 105-E16:2006 Part E16: Colour fastness to water spotting on upholstery fabrics
  - ISO 105-F01:2001 Part F01: Specification for wool adjacent fabric
  - ISO 105-F02:2009 Part F02: Specification for cotton and viscose adjacent fabrics
  - ISO 105-F03:2001 Part F03: Specification for polyamide adjacent fabric
  - ISO 105-F04:2001 Part F04: Specification for polyester adjacent fabric
  - ISO 105-F05:2001 Part F05: Specification for acrylic adjacent fabric
  - ISO 105-F06:2000 Part F06: Specification for silk adjacent fabric
  - ISO 105-F07:2001 Part F07: Specification for secondary acetate adjacent fabric
  - ISO 105-F09:2009 Part F09: Specification for cotton rubbing cloth
  - ISO 105-F10:1989 Part F10: Specification for adjacent fabric: Multifibre
  - ISO 105-G01:2016 Part G01: Colour fastness to nitrogen oxides
  - ISO 105-G02:1993 Part G02: Colour fastness to burnt-gas fumes
  - ISO 105-G03:1993 Part G03: Colour fastness to ozone in the atmosphere
  - ISO 105-G04:2016 Part G04: Colour fastness to oxides of nitrogen in the atmosphere at high humidities
  - ISO 105-J01:1997 Part J01: General principles for measurement of surface colour
  - ISO 105-J02:1997 Part J02: Instrumental assessment of relative whiteness
  - ISO 105-J03:2009 Part J03: Calculation of colour differences
  - ISO 105-J05:2007 Part J05: Method for the instrumental assessment of the colour inconstancy of a specimen with change in illuminant (CMCCON02)
  - ISO 105-N01:1993 Part N01: Colour fastness to bleaching: Hypochlorite
  - ISO 105-N02:1993 Part N02: Colour fastness to bleaching: Peroxide
  - ISO 105-N03:1993 Part N03: Colour fastness to bleaching: Sodium chlorite (mild)
  - ISO 105-N04:1993 Part N04: Colour fastness to bleaching: Sodium chlorite (severe)
  - ISO 105-N05:1993 Part N05: Colour fastness to stoving
  - ISO 105-P01:1993 Part P01: Colour fastness to dry heat (excluding pressing)
  - ISO 105-P02:2002 Part P02: Colour fastness to pleating: Steam pleating
  - ISO 105-S01:1993 Part S01: Colour fastness to vulcanization: Hot air
  - ISO 105-S02:1993 Part S02: Colour fastness to vulcanization: Sulfur monochloride
  - ISO 105-S03:1993 Part S03: Colour fastness to vulcanization: Open steam
  - ISO 105-X01:1993 Part X01: Colour fastness to carbonizing: Aluminium chloride
  - ISO 105-X02:1993 Part X02: Colour fastness to carbonizing: Sulfuric acid
  - ISO 105-X03:1987 Part X03: Colour fastness to chlorination [Withdrawn without replacement]
  - ISO 105-X04:1994 Part X04: Colour fastness to mercerizing
  - ISO 105-X05:1994 Part X05: Colour fastness to organic solvents
  - ISO 105-X06:1994 Part X06: Colour fastness to soda boiling
  - ISO 105-X07:1994 Part X07: Colour fastness to cross-dyeing: Wool
  - ISO 105-X08:1994 Part X08: Colour fastness to degumming
  - ISO 105-X09:1993 Part X09: Colour fastness to formaldehyde
  - ISO 105-X10:1993 Part X10: Assessment of migration of textile colours into polyvinyl chloride coatings
  - ISO 105-X11:1994 Part X11: Colour fastness to hot pressing
  - ISO 105-X12:2016 Part X12: Colour fastness to rubbing
  - ISO 105-X13:1994 Part X13: Colour fastness of wool dyes to processes using chemical means for creasing, pleating and setting
  - ISO 105-X14:1994 Part X14: Colour fastness to acid chlorination of wool: Sodium dichloroisocyanurate
  - ISO 105-X16:2016 Part X16: Colour fastness to rubbing — Small areas
  - ISO 105-X18:2007 Part X18: Assessment of the potential to phenolic yellowing of materials
  - ISO 105-X19:2020 Part X19: Colour fastness to rubbing (Gakushin test method)
  - ISO 105-Z01:1993 Part Z01: Colour fastness to metals in the dye-bath: Chromium salts
  - ISO 105-Z02:1993 Part Z02: Colour fastness to metals in the dye-bath: Iron and copper
  - ISO 105-Z03:1996 Part Z03: Intercompatibility of basic dyes for acrylic fibres
  - ISO 105-Z04:1995 Part Z04: Dispersibility of disperse dyes
  - ISO 105-Z05:1996 Part Z05: Determination of the dusting behaviour of dyes
  - ISO 105-Z06:1998 Part Z06: Evaluation of dye and pigment migration
  - ISO 105-Z07:1995 Part Z07: Determination of application solubility and solution stability of water-soluble dyes
  - ISO 105-Z08:1995 Part Z08: Determination of solubility and solution stability of reactive dyes in the presence of electrolytes
  - ISO 105-Z09:1995 Part Z09: Determination of cold water solubility of water-soluble dyes
  - ISO 105-Z10:1997 Part Z10: Determination of relative colour strength of dyes in solution
  - ISO 105-Z11:1998 Part Z11: Evaluation of speckiness of colorant dispersions
- ISO/R 106:1959 Shipbuilding — Light metal rivets — Diameters and clearances [Withdrawn without replacement]
- ISO/R 107:1959 Shipbuilding — Light metal rivets — Ship heads [Withdrawn without replacement]
- ISO 108:1976 Textile machinery and accessories — Weaving looms — Definition of left and right sides
- ISO 109:1982 Textile machinery — Working widths of weaving machines
- ISO 110:1978 Textile machinery and accessories — Cones for yarn winding (cross wound) — Half angle of the cone 9 degrees 15' [Withdrawn without replacement]
- ISO 111:1978 Textile machinery and accessories — Cones for yarn winding (cross wound) — Half angle of the cone 4 degrees 20' [Withdrawn: Replaced with ISO 8489-3]
- ISO 112:1983 Textile machinery and accessories — Cones for yarn winding (cross wound) — Half angle of the cone 3 degrees 30' [Withdrawn: Replaced with ISO 8489-2]
- ISO 113:2010 Rolling bearings — Plummer block housings — Boundary dimensions
- ISO 114:1980 Unalloyed magnesium ingots — Chemical composition [Withdrawn: replaced with ISO 8287]
- ISO 115:2003 Unalloyed aluminium ingots for remelting — Classification and composition
- ISO/R 116:1959 Pesticides — Common names — First series of terms [Withdrawn: replaced with ISO 1750]
- ISO/R 117:1959 Plastics — Polystyrene — Determination of boiling water absorption [Withdrawn: replaced with ISO 62]
- ISO 118:1976 Plastics — Polystyrene — Determination of methanol-soluble matter [Withdrawn without replacement]
- ISO 119:1977 Plastics — Phenol-formaldehyde mouldings — Determination of free phenols — Iodometric method
- ISO 120:1977 Plastics — Phenol-formaldehyde mouldings — Determination of free ammonia and ammonium compounds — Colorimetric comparison method
- ISO 121:1980 Magnesium-aluminium-zinc alloy ingots and alloy castings — Chemical composition and mechanical properties of sand cast reference test bars [Withdrawn: replaced with ISO 16220]
- ISO/R 122:1959 Composition of magnesium-aluminium-zinc alloy ingots for casting purposes [Withdrawn: replaced with ISO 121, and later ISO 16220]
- ISO 123:2001 Rubber latex — Sampling
- ISO 124:2014 Latex, rubber — Determination of total solids content
- ISO 125:2020 Natural rubber latex concentrate — Determination of alkalinity
- ISO 126:2005 Natural rubber latex concentrate — Determination of dry rubber content
- ISO 127:2018 Rubber, natural latex concentrate — Determination of KOH number
- ISO 128 Technical product documentation — General principles of representation
- ISO 129 Technical product documentation — Indication of dimensions and tolerances
  - ISO 129-1:2018 Part 1: General principles
  - ISO 129-4:2013 Part 4: Dimensioning of shipbuilding drawings
  - ISO 129-5:2018 Part 5: Dimensioning of structural metal work
- ISO/R 130:1959 Aircraft — Colour identification of mechanical control circuits [Withdrawn without replacement]
- ISO 131:1979 Acoustics — Expression of physical and subjective magnitudes of sound or noise in air [Withdrawn without replacement]
- ISO 132:2017 Rubber, vulcanized or thermoplastic — Determination of flex cracking and crack growth (De Mattia)
- ISO 133:1983 Rubber, vulcanized — Determination of crack growth (De Mattia) [Withdrawn: replaced with ISO 132]
- ISO 134:1973 Plain end steel tubes for general purposes [Withdrawn: replaced with ISO 4200]
- ISO/R 135:1959 Paper vocabulary — Second series of terms [Withdrawn: replaced with ISO 4046]
- ISO 136:1972 Steel — Simple torsion testing of wire [Withdrawn: replaced with ISO 7800]
- ISO 137:2015 Wool — Determination of fibre diameter — Projection microscope method
- ISO/R 138:1960 Textiles — Universal yarn count system [Withdrawn: replaced with ISO 1144]
- ISO 139:2005 Textiles — Standard atmospheres for conditioning and testing
- ISO 140 Acoustics — Measurement of sound insulation in buildings and of building elements
  - ISO 140-1:1997 Part 1: Requirements for laboratory test facilities with suppressed flanking transmission [Withdrawn: replaced with ISO 10140-(1–5)]
  - ISO 140-2:1991 Part 2: Determination, verification and application of precision data [Withdrawn: replaced with ISO 12999-1:2014]
  - ISO 140-3:1995 Part 3: Laboratory measurements of airborne sound insulation of building elements [Withdrawn: replaced with ISO 10140-(1–5)]
  - ISO 140-4:1998 Part 4: Field measurements of airborne sound insulation between rooms [Withdrawn: replaced with ISO 16283-1:2014]
  - ISO 140-5:1998 Part 5: Field measurements of airborne sound insulation of façade elements and façades [Withdrawn: replaced with ISO 16283-(1,3):2014]
  - ISO 140-6:1998 Part 6: Laboratory measurements of impact sound insulation of floors [Withdrawn: replaced with ISO 10140-(1–5)]
  - ISO 140-7:1998 Part 7: Field measurements of impact sound insulation of floors [Withdrawn: replaced with ISO 16283-(1–2)]
  - ISO 140-8:1997 Part 8: Laboratory measurements of the reduction of transmitted impact noise by floor coverings on a heavyweight standard floor [Withdrawn: replaced with ISO 10140-(1–5)]
  - ISO 140-9:1985 Part 9: Laboratory measurement of room-to-room airborne sound insulation of a suspended ceiling with a plenum above it [Withdrawn: replaced with ISO 10848-2]
  - ISO 140-10:1991 Part 10: Laboratory measurement of airborne sound insulation of small building elements [Withdrawn: replaced with ISO 10140-(1–5)]
  - ISO 140-11:1991 Part 11: Laboratory measurements of the reduction of transmitted impact sound by floor coverings on lightweight reference floors [Withdrawn: replaced with ISO 10140-(1–5)]
  - ISO 140-12:2000 Part 12: Laboratory measurement of room-to-room airborne and impact sound insulation of an access floor [Withdrawn: replaced with ISO 10848-2]
  - ISO/TR 140-13:1997 Part 13: Guidelines [Withdrawn: replaced with ISO 140-14]
  - ISO 140-14:2004 Part 14: Guidelines for special situations in the field [Withdrawn: replaced with ISO 16283-1:2014]
  - ISO 140-16:2006 Part 16: Laboratory measurement of the sound reduction index improvement by additional lining [Withdrawn: replaced with ISO 10140-(1–5)]
  - ISO 140-18:2006 Part 18: Laboratory measurement of sound generated by rainfall on building elements [Withdrawn: replaced with ISO 10140-(1,5):2016]
- ISO 141:1976 Textile machinery and accessories — Pirn winders and cross winders — Definition of left and right sides
- ISO 142:1976 Textile machinery and accessories — Weaving preparatory machines — Definition of left and right sides
- ISO 143:1977 Textile machinery and accessories — Weft pirns for automatic looms [Withdrawn without replacement]
- ISO 144:1973 Steel — Reverse bend testing of wire [Withdrawn: replaced with ISO 7801]
- ISO/R 145:1960 Steel — Wrapping test for wire [Withdrawn: replaced with ISO 7802]
- ISO 146:1984 Metallic materials — Hardness test — Verification of Vickers hardness testing machines HV 0,2 to HV 100 [Withdrawn: replaced with ISO 6507-2]
  - ISO 146-2:1993 Metallic materials — Verification of Vickers hardness testing machines — Part 2: Less than HV 0,2 [Withdrawn: replaced with ISO 6507-2]
- ISO/R 147:1960 Load calibration of testing machines for tensile testing of steel [Withdrawn: replaced with ISO 7500-1]
- ISO 148 Metallic materials — Charpy pendulum impact test
  - ISO 148-1:2016 Part 1: Test method
  - ISO 148-2:2016 Part 2: Verification of testing machines
  - ISO 148-3:2016 Part 3: Preparation and characterization of Charpy V-notch test pieces for indirect verification of pendulum impact machines
- ISO/R 149:1960 Modified Erichsen cupping test for steel sheet and strip [Withdrawn: replaced with ISO 8490]
- ISO 150:2018 Raw, refined and boiled linseed oil for paints and varnishes — Specifications and methods of test
- ISO 151:1974 Shipbuilding details — Marking of hatchway beams [Withdrawn without replacement]
- ISO/R 152:1960 Shipbuilding details — Marking of wooden hatchway covers [Withdrawn without replacement]
- ISO/R 153:1960 Shipbuilding details — Ordinary Glasses for scuttles and lights — Dimensions [Withdrawn without replacement]
- ISO/R 154: Shipbuilding details — Marking of rolled, drawn and extruded products in light metals or in light alloys [Withdrawn without replacement]
- ISO 155:2019 Belt drives — Pulleys — Limiting values for adjustment of centres
- ISO 156:1982 Metallic materials — Hardness test — Verification of Brinell hardness testing machines [Withdrawn: replaced with ISO 6506-2]
- ISO 157:1996 Coal — Determination of forms of sulfur
- ISO/R 158:1960 Coal — Determination of ash [Withdrawn: replaced with ISO 1171]
- ISO/R 159:1960 Coal — Determination of total sulfur by the Strambi method [Withdrawn without replacement]
- ISO 160:1980 Asbestos-cement pressure pipes and joints [Withdrawn without replacement]
- ISO 161 Thermoplastics pipes for the conveyance of fluids — Nominal outside diameters and nominal pressures
  - ISO 161-1:2018 Part 1: Metric series
  - ISO 161-2:1996 Part 2: Inch-based series
- ISO 162:1985 Cinematography — Head gaps and sound records for three-, four-, or six-track magnetic sound records on 35 mm and single-track on 17,5 mm motion-picture film containing no picture — Positions and width dimensions
- ISO/R 163:1960 Cinematography — Magnetic striping of 16 mm film perforated along both edges [Withdrawn without replacement]
- ISO/R 164:1960 Aluminium and aluminium alloys — Castings — Chemical composition [Withdrawn: replaced with ISO 3522]
- ISO/R 165:1960 Metallic materials — Steel tubes — Flanging test [Withdrawn: replaced with ISO 8494]
- ISO/R 166:1960 Metallic materials — Steel tubes — Drift expanding test [Withdrawn: replaced with ISO 8493]
- ISO/R 167:1960 Metallic materials — Steel tubes — Bend test [Withdrawn: replaced with ISO 8491]
- ISO/R 168:1960 Stretchers [Withdrawn without replacement]
- ISO/R 169:1960 Sizes of photocopies (on paper) readable without optical devices [Withdrawn without replacement]
- ISO/R 170:1960 Shipbuilding — Anchor Chains — Stud links [Withdrawn: replaced with ISO 1704]
- ISO 171:1980 Plastics — Determination of bulk factor of moulding materials
- ISO 172:1978 Plastics — Phenol-formaldehyde mouldings — Detection of free ammonia
- ISO/R 173:1961 Plastics — Determination of the percentage of styrene in polystyrene with Wijs solution [Withdrawn without replacement]
- ISO 174:1974 Plastics — Homopolymer and copolymer resins of vinyl chloride — Determination of viscosity number in dilute solution [Withdrawn: replaced with ISO 1628-2]
- ISO 175:2010 Plastics — Methods of test for the determination of the effects of immersion in liquid chemicals
- ISO 176:2005 Plastics — Determination of loss of plasticizers — Activated carbon method
- ISO 177:2016 Plastics — Determination of migration of plasticizers
- ISO 178:2019 Plastics — Determination of flexural properties
- ISO 179 Plastics — Determination of Charpy impact properties
  - ISO 179-1:2010 Part 1: Non-instrumented impact test
  - ISO 179-2:2020 Part 2: Instrumented impact test
- ISO 180:2019 Plastics — Determination of Izod impact strength
- ISO 181:1981 Plastics — Determination of flammability characteristics of rigid plastics in the form of small specimens in contact with an incandescent rod [Withdrawn without replacement]
- ISO 182 Plastics — Determination of the tendency of compounds and products based on vinyl chloride homopolymers and copolymers to evolve hydrogen chloride and any other acidic products at elevated temperatures
  - ISO 182-1:1990 Part 1: Congo red method
  - ISO 182-2:1990 Part 2: pH method
  - ISO 182-3:1993 Part 3: Conductometric method
  - ISO 182-4:1993 Part 4: Potentiometric method
- ISO 183:1976 Plastics — Qualitative evaluation of the bleeding of colorants [Withdrawn without replacement]
- ISO/R 184:1961 Grey cast irons — Brinell hardness test [Withdrawn without replacement]
- ISO 185:2020 Grey cast irons — Classification
- ISO 186:2002 Paper and board — Sampling to determine average quality
- ISO 187:1990 Paper, board and pulps — Standard atmosphere for conditioning and testing and procedure for monitoring the atmosphere and conditioning of samples
- ISO 188:2011 Rubber, vulcanized or thermoplastic — Accelerated ageing and heat resistance tests
- ISO/R 189:1961 Principles of operation of standards marks [Withdrawn without replacement]
- ISO/R 190:1961 Tensile testing of light metals and their alloys [Withdrawn: replaced with ISO 6892-1]
- ISO/R 191:1971 Brinell hardness test for light metals and their alloys [Withdrawn: replaced with ISO 6506-1 and ISO 6506-4]
- ISO/R 192:1971 Wickers hardness test for light metals and their alloys [Withdrawn: replaced with ISO 6507-1 and ISO 6507-4]
- ISO/R 193:1961 Microcopies on transparent bases: sizes of recommended bases [Withdrawn without replacement]
- ISO 194:1981 Plastics — List of equivalent terms [Withdrawn: replaced with ISO 472]
- ISO/R 195:1961 Copper and copper alloys — Drift expanding test [Withdrawn: replaced with ISO 8493]
- ISO 196:1978 Wrought copper and copper alloys — Detection of residual stress — Mercury(I) nitrate test
- ISO 197 Copper and copper alloys — Terms and definitions
  - ISO 197-1:1983 Part 1: Materials
  - ISO 197-2:1983 Part 2: Unwrought products (Refinery shapes)
  - ISO 197-3:1983 Part 3: Wrought products
  - ISO 197-4:1983 Part 4: Castings
  - ISO 197-5:1980 Part 5: Methods of processing and treatment
- ISO/R 198:1961 Double-deck flat pallets for through transit of goods [Withdrawn without replacement]
- ISO 199:2014 Rolling bearings — Thrust bearings — Geometrical product specification (GPS) and tolerance values

== ISO 200 – ISO 499 ==
- ISO/R 200:1961 Rolling bearings — Tolerances — Definitions [Withdrawn: replaced with ISO 1132]
- ISO/R 201:1961 Rolling bearings — Radial internal clearance in unloaded radial groove type ball bearings with cylindrical bore [Withdrawn: replaced with ISO 5753]
- ISO/R 202:1961 Metallic materials — Steel tubes — Flattening Test [Withdrawn: replaced with ISO 8492]
- ISO/R 203:1961 Metallic materials — Interrupted uniaxial creep testing in tension — Method of test [Withdrawn without replacement]
- ISO 204:2018 Metallic materials — Uniaxial creep testing in tension — Method of test
- ISO/R 205:1961 Steel — Determination of proof stress and proving test at elevated temperature [Withdrawn: replaced with ISO 783, and later ISO 6892-2]
- ISO/R 206:1961 Steel — Creep stress rupture testing of at elevated temperatures [Withdrawn: replaced with ISO 204]
- ISO 207:1980 Magnesium and magnesium alloys — Unalloyed magnesium — Chemical composition [Withdrawn: replaced with ISO 8287]
- ISO/R 208:1961 Aluminium and aluminium alloys — Castings — Chemical composition (complement to ISO/R 164) [Withdrawn: replaced with ISO 3522]
- ISO 209:2007 Aluminium and aluminium alloys — Chemical composition
- ISO 210:2023 Essential oils — General rules for packaging, conditioning and storage
- ISO 211:2023 Essential oils — General rules for labelling and marking of containers
- ISO 212:2007 Essential oils — Sampling
- ISO 213:1982 Machine tools — Lathe tool posts — Overall internal height [Withdrawn without replacement]
- ISO 214:1976 Documentation — Abstracts for publications and documentation
- ISO 215:1986 Documentation — Presentation of contributions to periodicals and other serials
- ISO 216:2007 Writing paper and certain classes of printed matter — Trimmed sizes — A and B series, and indication of machine direction
- ISO 217:2013 Paper — Untrimmed sizes — Designation and tolerances for primary and supplementary ranges, and indication of machine direction
- ISO/R 218:1961 Scale of 35 mm microfilms for international exchange [Withdrawn without replacement]
- ISO/R 219:1961 Pesticides — Common names — Second series of terms [Withdrawn: replaced with ISO 1750]
- ISO/R 220:1961 Textile fibres — Some methods of sampling for testing [Withdrawn: replaced with ISO 1130]
- ISO 221:1976 Metallic materials — Steel tubes — Wall thicknesses [Withdrawn without replacement]
- ISO/R 222:1968 Aerospace — Characteristics of aircraft electrical systems [Withdrawn: replaced with ISO 1540]
- ISO 223:1975 Aircraft — Ground support electrical supplies — General requirements [Withdrawn: replaced with ISO 6858]
- ISO/TR 224:1998 Aircraft — Declaration of design and performance for aircraft equipment — Standard form [Withdrawn without replacement]
- ISO 225:2010 Fasteners — Bolts, screws, studs and nuts — Symbols and descriptions of dimensions
- ISO 226:2003 Acoustics — Normal equal-loudness-level contours
- ISO 227:1978 Textile machinery and accessories — Single box pickers for centre tip shuttles for automatic looms and related picking stick dimensions [Withdrawn without replacement]
- ISO 228 Pipe threads where pressure-tight joints are not made on the threads
- ISO 229:1973 Machine tools — Speeds and feeds
- ISO 230 Test code for machine tools
  - ISO 230-1:2012 Part 1: Geometric accuracy of machines operating under no-load or quasi-static conditions
  - ISO 230-2:2014 Part 2: Determination of accuracy and repeatability of positioning of numerically controlled axes
  - ISO 230-3:2020 Part 3: Determination of thermal effects
  - ISO 230-4:2005 Part 4: Circular tests for numerically controlled machine tools
  - ISO 230-5:2000 Part 5: Determination of the noise emission
  - ISO 230-6:2002 Part 6: Determination of positioning accuracy on body and face diagonals (Diagonal displacement tests)
  - ISO 230-7:2015 Part 7: Geometric accuracy of axes of rotation
  - ISO/TR 230-8:2010 Part 8: Vibrations
  - ISO/TR 230-9:2005 Part 9: Estimation of measurement uncertainty for machine tool tests according to series ISO 230, basic equations
  - ISO 230-10:2016 Part 10: Determination of the measuring performance of probing systems of numerically controlled machine tools
  - ISO/TR 230-11:2018 Part 11: Measuring instruments suitable for machine tool geometry tests
  - ISO 230-12:2022 Part 12: Accuracy of finished test pieces
- ISO/R 231:1961 Paper vocabulary — Third series of terms [Withdrawn: replaced with ISO 4046]
- ISO/R 232:1961 Straight-sides splines and gauges — Dimensions in inches [Withdrawn without replacement]
- ISO 233 Information and documentation — Transliteration of Arabic characters into Latin characters
- ISO 234 Files and rasps
  - ISO 234-1:1983 Part 1: Dimensions
  - ISO 234-2:1982 Part 2: Characteristics of cut
- ISO 235:2016 Parallel shank jobber and stub series drills and Morse taper shank drills
- ISO 236 Reamers
  - ISO 236-1:1976 Hand reamers
  - ISO 236-2:2013 Part 2: Long fluted machine reamers with Morse taper shanks
- ISO 237:1975 Rotating tools with parallel shanks — Diameters of shanks and sizes of driving squares
- ISO 238:2016 Reduction sleeves and extension sockets for tools with Morse taper shanks
- ISO 239:1999 Drill chuck tapers
- ISO 240:2016 Milling cutters — Interchangeability dimensions for cutter arbors or cutter mandrels
- ISO 241:1994 Shanks for turning and planing tools — Shapes and dimensions of the section
- ISO 242:2014 Carbide tips for brazing on turning tools
- ISO 243:2014 Turning tools with carbide tips — External tools
- ISO 244:1979 Aircraft — Sealing wire
- ISO 245:1998 Aerospace — Lockwire — Diameters
- ISO 246:2007 Rolling bearings — Cylindrical roller bearings, separate thrust collars — Boundary dimensions
- ISO 247 Rubber — Determination of ash
  - ISO 247-1:2018 Part 1: Combustion method
  - ISO 247-2:2018 Part 2: Thermogravimetric analysis (TGA)
- ISO 248 Rubber, raw – Determination of volatile-matter content
  - ISO 248-1:2011 Part 1: Hot-mill method and oven method
  - ISO 248-2:2019 Part 2: Thermogravimetric methods using an automatic analyser with an infrared drying unit
- ISO 249:2016 Rubber, raw natural — Determination of dirt content
- ISO/R 250:1962 Rubber, raw natural — Sampling and preparation [Withdrawn: replaced with ISO 1795 and ISO 1796 (which was later replaced by ISO 1795)]
- ISO 251:2012 Conveyor belts with textile carcass — Widths and lengths
- ISO 252:2007 Conveyor belts — Adhesion between constitutive elements — Test methods
- ISO/R 253:1962 Belt drives — Grooved pulleys — sections Y and Z [Withdrawn: replaced with ISO 4183]
- ISO 254:2011 Belt drives — Pulleys — Quality, finish and balance
- ISO 255:1990 Belt drives — Pulleys for V-belts (system based on datum width) — Geometrical inspection of grooves
- ISO/R 256:1962 Belt drives — Section checking for V-belts [Withdrawn without replacement]
- ISO 257:2018 Pesticides and other agrochemicals — Principles for the selection of common names
- ISO/R 258:1961 Pesticides — Common names — Third series of terms [Withdrawn: replaced with ISO 1750]
- ISO 259 Information and documentation — Transliteration of Hebrew characters into Latin characters
- ISO/R 260:1962 Terms related to microcopies and their bases [Withdrawn without replacement]
- ISO 261:1998 ISO general purpose metric screw threads — General plan
- ISO 262:1998 ISO general purpose metric screw threads — Selected sizes for screws, bolts and nuts
- ISO 263:1973 ISO inch screw threads — General plan and selection for screws, bolts and nuts — Diameter range 0,06 to 6 in'
- ISO 264:1976 Unplasticized polyvinyl chloride (PVC) fittings with plain sockets for pipes under pressure — Laying lengths — Metric series [Withdrawn: replaced with ISO 1452-3]
- ISO 265 Pipes and fittings of plastics materials — Fittings for domestic and industrial waste pipes — Basic dimensions: Metric series
  - ISO 265-1:1988 Part 1: Unplasticized poly(vinyl chloride) (PVC-U)
- ISO 266:1997 Acoustics — Preferred frequencies
- ISO/R 267:1962 Aircraft — Figures for instrument dials and number plates [Withdrawn without replacement]
- ISO 268:1980 Aircraft — Mechanical and electromechanical indicators — General requirements
- ISO 269:1985 Correspondence envelopes – Designation and sizes [Withdrawn without replacement]
- ISO 270:1975 Textile fibres — Determination of length by measuring individual fibres [Withdrawn: replaced with ISO 6989]
- ISO/R 271:1962 Textiles — Implementation of the Tex System for designating the size of fibres [Withdrawn: replaced with ISO 1144]
- ISO 272:1982 Fasteners — Hexagon products — Widths across flats
- ISO 273:1979 Fasteners — Clearance holes for bolts and screws
- ISO 274:1975 Copper tubes of circular section — Dimensions [Withdrawn without replacement]
- ISO/R 275:1962 Zinc Oxide for paints — Requirements and methods of test [Withdrawn without replacement]
- ISO 276:2019 Binders for paints and varnishes — Linseed stand oil — Requirements and methods of test
- ISO 277:2002 Binders for paints and varnishes — Raw tung oil — Requirements and methods of test
- ISO/R 278:1962 Essential oils — Standard layout for methods of analysis of essential oils [Withdrawn without replacement]
- ISO 279:1998 Essential oils — Determination of relative density at 20 degrees C – Reference method
- ISO 280:1998 Essential oils — Determination of refractive index
- ISO 281:2007 Rolling bearings — Dynamic load ratings and rating life
- ISO 282:1992 Conveyor belts — Sampling
- ISO 283:2015 Textile conveyor belts — Full thickness tensile strength, elongation at break and elongation at the reference load — Test method
- ISO 284:2012 Conveyor belts – Electrical conductivity – Specification and test method
- ISO/R 285:1962 Metallic materials — Steel tubes — Butt welding bends
- ISO 286 Geometrical product specifications (GPS) — ISO code system for tolerances on linear sizes
  - ISO 286-1:2010 Part 1: Basis of tolerances, deviations and fits
  - ISO 286-2:2010 Part 2: Tables of standard tolerance classes and limit deviations for holes and shafts
- ISO 287:2017 Paper and board — Determination of moisture content of a lot — Oven-drying method
- ISO/R 288
  - ISO/R 288-1:1963 Part 1: Slotted and castle nuts with metric thread [Withdrawn without replacement]
  - ISO/R 288-2:1969 Part 2: Slotted and castle nuts with metric thread 42 up to and including 100 mm thread diameter [Withdrawn without replacement]
- ISO 289 Rubber, unvulcanized — Determinations using a shearing-disc viscometer
  - ISO 289-1:2015 Part 1: Determination of Mooney viscosity
  - ISO 289-2:2020 Part 2: Determination of pre-vulcanization characteristics
  - ISO 289-3:2015 Part 3: Determination of the Delta Mooney value for non-pigmented, oil-extended emulsion-polymerized SBR
  - ISO 289-4:2003 Part 4: Determination of the Mooney stress-relaxation rate
- ISO/R 290:1961 Pesticides — Common names — Fourth series of terms [Withdrawn: replaced by ISO 1750]
- ISO 291:2008 Plastics — Standard atmospheres for conditioning and testing
- ISO/R 292:1967 Plastics — Determination of the melt mass-flow rate (MFR) and the melt volume-flow rate (MVR) of thermoplastics [Withdrawn: replaced by ISO 1133]
- ISO 293:2004 Plastics — Compression moulding of test specimens of thermoplastic materials
- ISO 294 Plastics — Injection moulding of test specimens of thermoplastic materials
  - ISO 294-1:2017 Part 1: General principles, and moulding of multipurpose and bar test specimens
  - ISO 294-2:2018 Part 2: Small tensile bars
  - ISO 294-3:2020 Part 3: Small plates
  - ISO 294-4:2018 Part 4: Determination of moulding shrinkage
  - ISO 294-5:2017 Part 5: Preparation of standard specimens for investigating anisotropy
- ISO 295:2004 Plastics — Compression moulding of test specimens of thermosetting materials
- ISO 296:1991 Machine tools — Self-holding tapers for tool shanks
- ISO 297:1988 7/24 tapers for tool shanks for manual changing
- ISO 298:1973 Machine tools — Lathe centres — Sizes for interchangeability
- ISO 299:1987 Machine tool tables — T-slots and corresponding bolts
- ISO/R 300 Rolling bearings — ISO identification code
  - ISO/R 300-1:1963 Rolling bearings — ISO identification code for group I: Radial Ball and Rolling Bearings, group II: Thrust Ball and Rolling Bearings, and group III: Tapered Rolling Bearings, Metric Series [Withdrawn without replacement]
  - ISO/R 300-2:1965 Rolling bearings — ISO identification code for group IV: Tapered Rolling Bearings, Inch Series [Withdrawn without replacement]
- ISO 301:2006 Zinc alloy ingots intended for castings
- ISO 302:2015 Pulps — Determination of Kappa number
- ISO 303:2002 Road vehicles — Installation of lighting and light signalling devices for motor vehicles and their trailers [Withdrawn without replacement]
- ISO 304:1985 Surface active agents — Determination of surface tension by drawing up liquid films
- ISO 305:2019 Plastics — Determination of thermal stability of poly(vinyl chloride), related chlorine-containing homopolymers and copolymers and their compounds — Discoloration method
- ISO 306:2013 Plastics — Thermoplastic materials – Determination of Vicat softening temperature (VST)
- ISO 307:2019 Plastics — Polyamides — Determination of viscosity number
- ISO 308:1994 Plastics — Phenolic moulding materials — Determination of acetone-soluble matter (apparent resin content of material in the unmoulded state)
- ISO/R 309 Manganese ores — Methods of sampling
  - ISO/R 309-1:1963 Manganese ores — Methods of sampling — Part 1: Ore loaded in freight wagons [Withdrawn without replacement]
- ISO 310:1992 Manganese ores and concentrates — Determination of hygroscopic moisture content in analytical samples — Gravimetric method
- ISO/R 311:1963 Manganese ores and concentrates — Determination of silicon content [Withdrawn: replaced with ISO 5890]
- ISO 312:1986 Manganese ores — Determination of active oxygen content, expressed as manganese dioxide — Titrimetric method
- ISO/R 313:1963 Manganese ores and concentrates — Determination of total iron content [Withdrawn: replaced with ISO 7990]
- ISO 314:1981 Manganese ores — Determination of carbon dioxide content — Gravimetric method [Withdrawn without replacement]
- ISO 315:1984 Manganese ores and concentrates — Determination of nickel content — Dimethylglyoxime spectrometric method and flame atomic absorption spectrometric method
- ISO 316:1982 Manganese ores — Determination of cobalt content — Nitroso-R-salt photometric method [Withdrawn without replacement]
- ISO 317:1984 Manganese ores and concentrates — Determination of arsenic content — Spectrometric method
- ISO/R 318:1963 Manganese ores and concentrates — Determination of aluminium content [Withdrawn: replaced with ISO 4295]
- ISO/R 319:1963 Manganese ores and concentrates — Determination of manganese content [Withdrawn: replaced with ISO 4298]
- ISO 320:1981 Manganese ores — Determination of sulphur content — Barium sulphate gravimetric methods and sulphur dioxide titrimetric method after combustion
- ISO/R 321:1963 Manganese ores and concentrates — Determination of phosphorus content [Withdrawn: replaced with ISO 4293]
- ISO/R 322:1978 Manganese ores and concentrates — Determination of copper content [Withdrawn: replaced with ISO 4294]
- ISO/R 323:1963 Manganese ores and concentrates — Determination of lead content [Withdrawn without replacement]
- ISO 324:1978 Textile machinery and accessories — Cones for cross winding for dyeing purposes — Half angle of the cone 4 degrees 20' [Withdrawn: replaced with ISO 8489-4]
- ISO/R 325:1963 Textile machinery and accessories — Wood cones for cross winding — Half angle of the cone 4 degrees 20' [Withdrawn without replacement]
- ISO/R 326:1963 Textile machinery and accessories — Wood cones for cross winding — Nominal half angle of the cone 5 degrees 57' [Withdrawn without replacement]
- ISO/R 327:1963 Textile machinery and accessories — Wood cones for cross winding — Half angle of the cone 3 degrees 30' [Withdrawn without replacement]
- ISO 328:1974 Picture postcards and lettercards — Size [Withdrawn without replacement]
- ISO/R 329:1963 Large pallets for through transit of goods [Withdrawn without replacement]
- ISO/R 330:1963 Thermoplastics pipes for the conveyance of fluids — Nominal outside diameters and nominal pressures — Inch-based series [Withdrawn: replaced with ISO 161-2]
- ISO 331:1983 Coal — Determination of moisture in the analysis sample — Direct gravimetric method [Withdrawn without replacement]
- ISO 332:1981 Coal — Determination of nitrogen — Macro Kjeldahl method [Withdrawn without replacement]
- ISO 333:1996 Coal — Determination of nitrogen — Semi-micro Kjeldahl method [Withdrawn without replacement]
- ISO 334:2020 Coal and coke — Determination of total sulfur — Eschka method
- ISO 335:1974 Hard coal — Determination of caking power — Roga test [Withdrawn without replacement]
- ISO 336:1976 Plain end steel tubes, welded and seamless — General table of dimensions and masses per unit length [Withdrawn: replaced with ISO 4200]
- ISO 337:1981 Road vehicles — 50 semi-trailer fifth wheel coupling pin — Basic and mounting/interchangeability dimensions
- ISO/R 338:1963 Lifeboats for less than one hundred people [Withdrawn without replacement]
- ISO/R 339:1963 Definition of terms appearing in ISO recommendations for oils and pigments [Withdrawn without replacement]
- ISO 340:2013 Conveyor belts — Laboratory scale flammability characteristics — Requirements and test method
- ISO 341:1976 Textile machinery and accessories — Cotton spinning machinery — Working width [Withdrawn without replacement]
- ISO 342:1983 Textile machinery and accessories — Worsted and woollen cards — Width of cylinder and width on the wire [Withdrawn without replacement]
- ISO/R 343:1963 Textile machinery and accessories — Warp tubes for ring spinning and ring doubling spindles — inch dimensions, tolerances, and gauges [Withdrawn without replacement]
- ISO 344:1981 Textile machinery and accessories — Spinning machines — Flyer bobbins [Withdrawn without replacement]
- ISO/R 345:1963 Shipbuilding details — Tests on galvanized steel wire ropes [Withdrawn without replacement]
- ISO/R 346:1963 Shipbuilding details — Galvanized steel wire ropes [Withdrawn without replacement]
- ISO/R 347:1963 Shipbuilding details — Anchor chains- End shackles [Withdrawn without replacement]
- ISO 348:1981 Hard coal — Determination of moisture in the analysis sample — Direct volumetric method [Withdrawn without replacement]
- ISO 349:2020 Hard coal — Audibert-Arnu dilatometer test
- ISO/R 350:1963 Hard coal — Determination of chlorine by the bomb-combustion method [Withdrawn without replacement]
- ISO 351:1996 Solid mineral fuels — Determination of total sulfur — High temperature combustion method [Withdrawn without replacement]
- ISO 352:1981 Solid mineral fuels — Determination of chlorine — High temperature combustion method [Withdrawn without replacement]
- ISO 353:1975 Processed writing paper and certain classes of printed matter — Method of expression of dimensions [Withdrawn without replacement]
- ISO 354:2003 Acoustics — Measurement of sound absorption in a reverberation room
- ISO 355:2019 Rolling bearings — Tapered roller bearings — Boundary dimensions and series designations
- ISO 356:1996 Essential oils — Preparation of test samples
- ISO/R 357:1963 Acoustics — Expression of the physical magnitudes of sound or noise in air [Withdrawn: replaced with ISO 131, now withdrawn without replacement]
- ISO 358:1975 Cinematography — Maximum aspect ratio of projector aperture for projection of 35 mm non-anamorphic motion-picture film — Specifications [Withdrawn without replacement]
- ISO 359:1983 Cinematography — Projectable image area on 16 mm motion-picture prints — Dimensions and location
- ISO 360:1975 Cinematography — Recording and reproducing head gaps for four-track magnetic sound records on 35 mm motion-picture film containing no picture — Positions and width dimensions [Withdrawn: replaced with ISO 162]
- ISO 361:1975 Basic ionizing radiation symbol
- ISO 362 Measurement of noise emitted by accelerating road vehicles — Engineering method
  - ISO 362-1:2015 Part 1: M and N categories
  - ISO 362-2:2009 Part 2: L category
  - ISO 362-3:2022 Part 3: Indoor testing M and N categories
- ISO 363 Textile machinery and accessories — Flat steel healds with closed end loops
  - ISO 363-1:2006 Part 1: Dimensions of healds manufactured of rolled steel wire [Withdrawn without replacement]
  - ISO 363-2:2006 Part 2: Dimensions of healds manufactured of hardened strip steel [Withdrawn without replacement]
- ISO 364:1983 Textile machinery and accessories — Twin wire healds for weaving machines with heald frames [Withdrawn without replacement]
- ISO 365:1982 Textile machinery and accessories — Twin wire healds with inset mail for Jacquard weaving
- ISO 366 Textile machinery and accessories — Reeds
  - ISO 366-2:2009 Part 2: Dimensions and designation of metal reeds with plate baulk
  - ISO 366-3:2009 Part 3: Dimensions and designation of metal reeds with double-spring baulk
  - ISO 366-4:2005 Part 4: Dimensions and designation of plastic-bound metal reeds [Withdrawn without replacement]
  - ISO 366-5:2006 Part 5: Dimensions and designation of profile capsules [Withdrawn without replacement]
- ISO 367:1976 Textile machinery and accessories — Metal reeds with plate baulk — Dimensions [Withdrawn: replaced with ISO 366-2]
- ISO 368:2017 Spinning preparatory, spinning and doubling (twisting) machinery — Tubes for ring-spinning, doubling and twisting spindles, taper 1:38 and 1:64
- ISO 369:2009 Machine tools — Symbols for indications appearing on machine tools
- ISO 370:1975 Toleranced dimensions — Conversion from inches into millimetres and vice versa [Withdrawn without replacement]
- ISO/R 371:1964 Terms relating to microcopy apparatus [Withdrawn without replacement]
- ISO/R 372:1964 Paper vocabulary — Fourth series of terms [Withdrawn: replaced with ISO 4046]
- ISO/R 373:1964 General principles for fatigue testing of metals [Withdrawn without replacement]
- ISO 374 Protective gloves against dangerous chemicals and micro-organisms
  - ISO 374-1:2016 Part 1: Terminology and performance requirements for chemical risks
  - ISO 374-2:2019 Part 2: Determination of resistance to penetration
  - ISO 374-4:2019 Part 4: Determination of resistance to degradation by chemicals
  - ISO 374-5:2016 Part 5: Terminology and performance requirements for micro-organisms risks
- ISO 375:1974 Steel — Tensile testing of tubes [Withdrawn: replaced with ISO 6892-1]
- ISO 376:2011 Metallic materials — Calibration of force-proving instruments used for the verification of uniaxial testing machines
- ISO 377:2017 Steel and steel products — Location and preparation of samples and test pieces for mechanical testing
- ISO 378:1980 Gymnastic equipment — Parallel bars [Withdrawn without replacement]
- ISO 379:1980 Gymnastic equipment — Horizontal bar [Withdrawn without replacement]
- ISO/R 380:1964 Gymnastic equipment — Rings [Withdrawn without replacement]
- ISO/R 381:1964 Gymnastic equipment — Vaulting horse and pommeled horse [Withdrawn without replacement]
- ISO/R 382:1964 Gymnastic equipment — Balancing Beam [Withdrawn without replacement]
- ISO 383:1976 Laboratory glassware — Interchangeable conical ground joints
- ISO 384:2015 Laboratory glass and plastics ware — Principles of design and construction of volumetric instruments
- ISO 385:2005 Laboratory glassware — Burettes
- ISO 386:1977 Liquid-in-glass laboratory thermometers — Principles of design, construction and use [Withdrawn without replacement]
- ISO 387:1977 Hydrometers — Principles of construction and adjustment
- ISO/R 388:1964 ISO metric series for basic thicknesses of sheet and diameters of wire [Withdrawn without replacement]
- ISO 389 Acoustics — Reference zero for the calibration of audiometric equipment
  - ISO 389-1:2017 Part 1: Reference equivalent threshold sound pressure levels for pure tones and supra-aural earphones
  - ISO 389-2:1994 Part 2: Reference equivalent threshold sound pressure levels for pure tones and insert earphones
  - ISO 389-3:2016 Part 3: Reference equivalent threshold vibratory force levels for pure tones and bone vibrators
  - ISO 389-4:1994 Part 4: Reference levels for narrow-band masking noise
  - ISO 389-5:2006 Part 5: Reference equivalent threshold sound pressure levels for pure tones in the frequency range 8 kHz to 16 kHz
  - ISO 389-6:2007 Part 6: Reference threshold of hearing for test signals of short duration
  - ISO 389-7:2019 Part 7: Reference threshold of hearing under free-field and diffuse-field listening conditions
  - ISO 389-8:2004 Part 8: Reference equivalent threshold sound pressure levels for pure tones and circumaural earphones
  - ISO 389-9:2009 Part 9: Preferred test conditions for the determination of reference hearing threshold levels
- ISO 390:1993 Products in fibre-reinforced cement — Sampling and inspection
- ISO 391:1982 Building and sanitary pipes in asbestos-cement [Withdrawn without replacement]
- ISO 392:1986 Asbestos-cement pipe fittings for building and sanitary purposes
- ISO 393 Asbestos-cement products — Corrugated sheets and fittings for roofing and cladding
  - ISO 393-1:1983 Asbestos-cement products — Part 1: Corrugated sheets and fittings for roofing and cladding [Withdrawn without replacement]
  - ISO 393-2:1986 Asbestos-cement products — Part 2: Asbestos-cement-cellulose corrugated sheets and fittings for roofing and cladding [Withdrawn without replacement]
  - ISO 393-3:1984 Asbestos-cement products — Part 3: Asymmetrical section corrugated sheets and fittings for roofing and cladding [Withdrawn without replacement]
  - ISO 393-4:1986 Asbestos-cement products — Part 4: Trapezoidal section sheets for roofing and cladding [Withdrawn without replacement]
  - ISO 393-5:1987 Asbestos-cement products — Part 5: Short corrugated and asymmetrical section sheets and fittings for roofing [Withdrawn without replacement]
- ISO/R 394:1964 Asymmetrical section corrugated sheets in asbestos-cement for roofing and cladding [Withdrawn without replacement]
- ISO 395:1983 Asbestos-cement slates [Withdrawn without replacement]
- ISO 396 Products in fibre reinforced cement
  - ISO 396-1:1980 Part 1: Asbestos-cement flat sheets [Withdrawn without replacement]
  - ISO 396-2:1980 Part 2: Silica-asbestos-cement flat sheets [Withdrawn without replacement]
  - ISO 396-3:1980 Part 3: Cellulose-asbestos-cement flat sheets [Withdrawn without replacement]
- ISO/R 397:1964 Copper and copper alloys — Wire — Wrapping test [Withdrawn: replaced with ISO 7802]
- ISO/R 398:1964 Copper and copper alloys — Bend test [Withdrawn: replaced with ISO 7438]
- ISO/R 399:1964 Copper and copper alloys — Vickers hardness test [Withdrawn: replaced with ISO 6507-1 and ISO 6507-4]
- ISO/R 400:1964 Copper and copper alloys — Tensile test [Withdrawn: replaced with ISO 6892-1]
- ISO/R 401:1964 Copper and copper alloys — Tubes of circular section — Tensile test [Withdrawn: replaced with ISO 6892-1]
- ISO/R 402:1964 Copper and copper alloys — Wire — Tensile test [Withdrawn: replaced with ISO 6892-1]
- ISO/R 403:1964 Copper and copper alloys — Brinell hardness test [Withdrawn: replaced with ISO 6506-1 and ISO 6506-4]
- ISO 404:2013 Steel and steel products — General technical delivery requirements
- ISO/R 405:1964 Aircraft — Tow bar attachment fittings — Interface requirements [Withdrawn: replaced with ISO 8267, and later ISO 8267-1 and ISO 8267-2]
- ISO 406:1987 Technical drawings — Tolerancing of linear and angular dimensions [Withdrawn: replaced with ISO 129-1 and ISO 14405-2]
- ISO 407:2004 Small medical gas cylinders — Pin-index yoke-type valve connections
- ISO/R 408:1964 Safety Colours [Withdrawn: replaced with ISO 3864-1]
- ISO 409 Metallic materials — Hardness test — Tables of Vickers hardness values for use in tests made on flat surfaces
  - ISO 409-1:1982 Metallic materials — Hardness test — Tables of Vickers hardness values for use in tests made on flat surfaces — Part 1: HV 5 to HV 100 [Withdrawn: replaced with ISO 6507-1 and ISO 6507-4]
  - ISO 409-2:1983 Metallic materials — Hardness test — Tables of Vickers hardness values for use in tests made on flat surfaces — Part 2: HV 0,2 to less than HV 5 [Withdrawn: replaced with ISO 6507-1 and ISO 6507-4]
- ISO 410:1982 Metallic materials — Hardness test — Tables of Brinell hardness values for use in tests made on flat surfaces [Withdrawn: replaced with ISO 6506-1 and ISO 6506-4]
- ISO/R 411:1964 Pesticides — Common names — Fifth series of terms [Withdrawn: replaced with ISO 1750]
- ISO 412:1976 Gum spirit of turpentine and wood turpentines for paints and varnishes [Withdrawn without replacement]
- ISO 413:1974 Aircraft — Heads of lubricating nipples
- ISO/R 414:1965 Aircraft — Tyre Valves [Withdrawn without replacement]
- ISO 415:1975 Envelopes, postcards and similar articles — Cancellation area [Withdrawn without replacement]
- ISO 416:1974 Picture postcards — Area reserved for the address [Withdrawn without replacement]
- ISO 417:1993 Photography — Determination of residual thiosulfate and other related chemicals in processed photographic materials — Methods using iodine-amylose, methylene blue and silver sulfide [Withdrawn: replaced with ISO 18917]
- ISO 418:2001 Photography — Processing chemicals — Specifications for anhydrous sodium sulfite
- ISO 419:1972 Photography — Processing chemicals — Specifications for sodium thiosulfate pentahydrate [Withdrawn: replaced with ISO 10636]
- ISO 420:1994 Photography — Processing chemicals — Specifications for potassium bromide
- ISO/R 421:1965 Photography — Processing chemicals — Method for indicating the stability of the images of processed black-and white films, plates, and papers [Withdrawn without replacement]
- ISO 422:1994 Photography — Processing chemicals — Specifications for p-methylaminophenol sulfate
- ISO 423:1994 Photography — Processing chemicals — Specifications for hydroquinone
- ISO 424:1994 Photography — Processing chemicals — Specifications for anhydrous sodium carbonate and sodium carbonate monohydrate
- ISO 425:1973 Photography — Sensitized materials — Quantity packaging [Withdrawn without replacement]
- ISO 426 Wrought copper-zinc alloys — Chemical composition and forms of wrought products
  - ISO 426-1:1983 Wrought copper-zinc alloys — Chemical composition and forms of wrought products — Part 1: Non-leaded and special copper-zinc alloys [Withdrawn without replacement]
  - ISO 426-2:1983 Wrought copper-zinc alloys — Chemical composition and forms of wrought products — Part 2: Leaded copper-zinc alloys [Withdrawn without replacement]
- ISO 427:1983 Wrought copper-tin alloys — Chemical composition and forms of wrought products [Withdrawn without replacement]
- ISO 428:1983 Wrought copper-aluminium alloys — Chemical composition and forms of wrought products [Withdrawn without replacement]
- ISO 429:1983 Wrought copper-nickel alloys — Chemical composition and forms of wrought products [Withdrawn without replacement]
- ISO 430:1983 Wrought copper-nickel-zinc alloys — Chemical composition and forms of wrought products [Withdrawn without replacement]
- ISO 431:1981 Copper refinery shapes [Withdrawn without replacement]
- ISO 432:1989 Ply type conveyor belts — Characteristics of construction [Withdrawn without replacement]
- ISO 433:2017 Conveyor belts — Marking
- ISO/R 434:1965 Y-section V-belts — Lengths [Withdrawn: replaced by ISO 4184]
- ISO 435:1975 Micrographics — ISO character — Description and use [Withdrawn: replaced by ISO 446]
- ISO/R 436:1965 Informative labelling [Withdrawn without replacement]
- ISO 437:1982 Steel and cast iron — Determination of total carbon content — Combustion gravimetric method [Withdrawn without replacement]
- ISO 438:1980 Paper — Determination of bulking thickness and apparent density [Withdrawn: replaced by ISO 534]
- ISO 439:2020 Steel and cast iron — Determination of silicon content — Gravimetric method
- ISO/R 440:1965 Aircraft — shape, size, and direction of operation of lever controls [Withdrawn without replacement]
- ISO 441:1997 Textile machinery and accessories — Drop wires for warp stop motions for weaving machines without automatic drawing-in
- ISO/R 442:1965 Verification of pendulum impact testing machines for testing steels [Withdrawn without replacement]
- ISO/R 443:1965 Aircraft — Marking of gas cylinders [Withdrawn without replacement]
- ISO 444:1981 Phlogopite mica blocks, thins and splittings — Grading by size [Withdrawn without replacement]
- ISO 445:2013 Pallets for materials handling — Vocabulary
- ISO 446:2004 Micrographics — ISO character and ISO test chart No. 1 — Description and use
- ISO 447:1984 Machine tools — Direction of operation of controls
- ISO 448:1981 Gas cylinders for industrial use — Marking for identification of content [Withdrawn without replacement]
- ISO 449:1997 Ships and marine technology — Magnetic compasses, binnacles and azimuth reading devices — Class A [Withdrawn: replaced with ISO 25862]
- ISO 450:1975 Aircraft — Connection for water of drinkable quality [Withdrawn: replaced with ISO 17775]
- ISO 451:1976 Aircraft — Pressure re-oiling connection
- ISO/R 452:1965 Essential characteristics of 35 mm microfilm ready apparatus [Withdrawn without replacement]
- ISO/R 453:1965 Surface active agents — Vocabulary — First list [Withdrawn: replaced with ISO 862]
- ISO 454:1975 Acoustics — Relation between sound pressure levels of narrow bands of noise in a diffuse field and in a frontally-incident free field for equal loudness [Withdrawn without replacement]
- ISO/R 455:1965 Analysis of soaps — Determination of total crude fatty acids [Withdrawn: replaced with ISO 685]
- ISO 456:1973 Surface active agents — Analysis of soaps — Determination of free caustic alkali
- ISO 457:1983 Soaps — Determination of chloride content — Titrimetric method
- ISO 458 Plastics — Determination of stiffness in torsion of flexible materials
  - ISO 458-1:1985 Part 1: General method
  - ISO 458-2:1985 Part 2: Application to plasticized compounds of homopolymers and copolymers of vinyl chloride
- ISO/R 459:1962 Narrow V-belts — Grooved pulleys — Groove sections SPZ, SPA, SPB [Withdrawn: replaced with ISO 4183]
- ISO/R 460:1962 Narrow V-belts — Lengths — Groove sections SPZ, SPA, SPB [Withdrawn: replaced with ISO 4184]
- ISO 461 Aircraft — Connectors for ground electrical supplies
  - ISO 461-1:2003 Part 1: Design, performance and test requirements
  - ISO 461-2:1985 Part 2: Dimensions
- ISO/R 462:1965 Plastics — Determination of the change of mechanical properties after contact with chemical substances [Withdrawn: replaced with ISO 175]
- ISO 463:2006 Geometrical Product Specifications (GPS) — Dimensional measuring equipment — Design and metrological characteristics of mechanical dial gauges
- ISO 464:2015 Rolling bearings — Radial bearings with locating snap ring — Dimensions, geometrical product specifications (GPS) and tolerance values
- ISO/R 465:1965 Rolling bearings — Double row self-aligning roller bearings — Radial internal clearance [Withdrawn: replaced with ISO 5753]
- ISO 466:1976 Cinematography — Image produced by 16 mm motion-picture camera aperture — Position and dimensions
- ISO/R 467:1966 Preferred modules and diametral pitches of cylindrical gears for general engineering [Withdrawn without replacement]
- ISO 468:1982 Surface roughness — Parameters, their values and general rules for specifying requirements [Withdrawn without replacement]
- ISO/R 469:1966 Aircraft — Conductors for general purpose aircraft electrical cables — Dimensions and characteristics [Withdrawn: replaced with ISO 2635]
- ISO/R 470:1966 Aircraft — Conductors for heat-resisting aircraft electrical cables — Dimensions and characteristics [Withdrawn: replaced with ISO 2635]
- ISO 471:1995 Rubber — Temperatures, humidities and times for conditioning and testing [Withdrawn: replaced with ISO 23529]
- ISO 472:2013 Plastics — Vocabulary
- ISO 473:2019 Lithopone pigments — General requirements and methods of testing
- ISO/R 474:1966 Aircraft — Conductors for general purpose aircraft electrical cables — Performance requirements [Withdrawn without replacement]
- ISO/R 475:1966 Rectangular refractory bricks — Dimensions [Withdrawn: replaced with ISO 5019-1]
- ISO 476:1982 Textile machinery and accessories — Pirn winding machines — Vocabulary
- ISO 477:1982 Textile machinery and accessories — Cone and cheese winding machines — Vocabulary
- ISO 478:1974 Paper — Untrimmed stock sizes for the ISO-A Series — ISO primary range [Withdrawn: replaced with ISO 217]
- ISO 479:1975 Paper — Untrimmed sizes — Designation and tolerances [Withdrawn: replaced with ISO 217]
- ISO/R 480:1966 Perforated metal cheese centres for bast fibre yearns [Withdrawn without replacement]
- ISO 481:1977 Textile machinery and accessories — Warper's beams — Terminology and main dimensions [Withdrawn: replaced with ISO 8116-2]
- ISO 482:1977 Aircraft — Propulsion units and components — Methods of numbering and describing direction of rotation [Withdrawn without replacement]
- ISO 483:2005 Plastics — Small enclosures for conditioning and testing using aqueous solutions to maintain the humidity at a constant value
- ISO 484 Shipbuilding — Ship screw propellers — Manufacturing tolerances
  - ISO 484-1:2015 Part 1: Propellers of diameter greater than 2,50 m
  - ISO 484-2:2015 Part 2: Propellers of diameter between 0,80 and 2,50 m inclusive
- ISO 485:1973 Aircraft water-methanol pressure connections
- ISO 486:1988 Cinematography — 16 mm motion-picture film perforated 8 mm Type R — Cutting and perforating dimensions
- ISO 487:1998 Steel roller chains, types S and C, attachments and sprockets
- ISO 488:2008 Milk — Determination of fat content — Gerber butyrometers [Withdrawn: replaced with ISO 19662]
- ISO 489:1999 Plastics — Determination of refractive index
- ISO 490:1993 Cinematography — Magnetic stripes and magnetic recording head gaps for sound record on 16 mm motion-picture film perforated along one edge (Type 1) — Positions and width dimensions
- ISO 491:2002 Cinematography — 35 mm motion-picture film and magnetic film — Cutting and perforating dimensions
- ISO 492:2014 Rolling bearings — Radial bearings — Geometrical product specifications (GPS) and tolerance values
- ISO 493:1975 Aircraft — Dimensions for single-hole mounting (Class 1 and Class 2) lever-operated manual switches
- ISO 494:2017 Cylindrical shank twist drills — Long series
- ISO 495:1966 Acoustics — Determination of sound power levels of noise sources [Withdrawn: replaced with ISO 3740, ISO 3741, ISO 3742, ISO 3743, ISO 3744, ISO 3745, and ISO 3746]
- ISO 496:1973 Driving and driven machines — Shaft heights [Withdrawn without replacement]
- ISO 497:1973 Guide to the choice of series of preferred numbers and of series containing more rounded values of preferred numbers
- ISO 498:1992 Natural rubber latex concentrate — Preparation of dry films
- ISO/R 499:1966 Paper — Internal diameters of cores of reels [Withdrawn without replacement]

== ISO 500 – ISO 699 ==
- ISO 500 Agricultural tractors — Rear-mounted power take-off types 1, 2, 3 and 4
- ISO 501:2012 Hard coal — Determination of the crucible swelling number
- ISO 502:2015 Coal — Determination of caking power — Gray-King coke test
- ISO/R 503:1966 Wrought magnesium-aluminium-zinc alloys — Chemical composition [Withdrawn: replaced with ISO 3116]
- ISO 504:1975 Turning tools with carbide tips — Designation and marking
- ISO 505:2017 Conveyor belts — Method for the determination of the tear propagation resistance of textile conveyor belts
- ISO 506:2020 Rubber latex, natural, concentrate — Determination of volatile fatty acid number
- ISO/R 507:1970 Acoustics — Procedure for describing aircraft noise heard on the ground using frequency weighting [Withdrawn: replaced with ISO 3891]
- ISO/R 508:1966 Ships and marine technology — Identification colours for the content of piping systems [Withdrawn: replaced with ISO 14726-1, now ISO 14726]
- ISO 509:1996 Pallet trucks — Principal dimensions [Withdrawn without replacement]
- ISO 510:1977 Red lead for paints [Withdrawn without replacement]
- ISO 511:1977 White lead pigments for paints [Withdrawn without replacement]
- ISO 512:1979 Road vehicles — Sound signalling devices — Technical specifications [Withdrawn without replacement]
- ISO 513:2012 Classification and application of hard cutting materials for metal removal with defined cutting edges — Designation of the main groups and groups of application
- ISO 514:2014 Turning tools with carbide tips — Internal tools
- ISO 515:1973 Photography — Stereo systems using 35 mm objectives on 35 mm film, five-perforation format — Specifications [Withdrawn without replacement]
- ISO 516:2019 Camera shutters — Timing — General definition and mechanical shutter measurements
- ISO 517:2008 Photography — Apertures and related properties pertaining to photographic lenses — Designations and measurements
- ISO 518:2006 Photography — Camera accessory shoes, with and without electrical contacts, for photoflash lamps and electronic photoflash units — Specification
- ISO 519:1992 Photography — Hand-held cameras — Flash-connector dimensions
- ISO 520:2010 Cereals and pulses — Determination of the mass of 1 000 grains
- ISO 521:2011 Machine chucking reamers with cylindrical shanks and Morse taper shanks
- ISO 522:1975 Special tolerances for reamers
- ISO 523:1974 Milling cutters — Recommended range of outside diameters [Withdrawn without replacement]
- ISO/R 524:1966 Hard metal wire drawing dies — Interchangeability dimensions of pellets and cases [Withdrawn without replacement]
- ISO 525:2020 Bonded abrasive products — Shape types, designation and marking
- ISO/R 526:1966 Significance to purchasers of marks indicating conformitity with standards [Withdrawn without replacement]
- ISO 527 Plastics — Determination of tensile properties
  - ISO 527-1:2019 Part 1: General principles
  - ISO 527-2:2012 Part 2: Test conditions for moulding and extrusion plastics
  - ISO 527-3:2018 Part 3: Test conditions for films and sheets
  - ISO 527-4:2021 Part 4: Test conditions for isotropic and orthotropic fibre-reinforced plastic composites
  - ISO 527-5:2009 Part 5: Test conditions for unidirectional fibre-reinforced plastic composites
- ISO 528:1983 Refractory products — Determination of pyrometric cone equivalent (refractoriness)
- ISO 529:2017 Short machine taps and hand taps
- ISO 530:1975 Aircraft — General purpose push-pull single-pole circuit-breakers — Dimensions
- ISO/R 531:1966 Cast iron sanitary pipes and fittings for waste water and ventilation [Withdrawn without replacement]
- ISO 532 Acoustics — Methods for calculating loudness
  - ISO 532-1:2017 Part 1: Zwicker method
  - ISO 532-2:2017 Part 2: Moore-Glasberg method
- ISO/R 533:1966 Rolling bearings — Double row cylindrical roller bearings type with tapered bore 1:12 [Withdrawn without replacement]
- ISO 534:2011 Paper and board — Determination of thickness, density and specific volume
- ISO 535:2014 Paper and board — Determination of water absorptiveness — Cobb method
- ISO 536:2019 Paper and board — Determination of grammage
- ISO 537:1989 Plastics — Testing with the torsion pendulum [Withdrawn: replaced with ISO 6721-1, ISO 6721-2, ISO 6721-4, and ISO 6721-10]
- ISO/R 538:1967 Conventional signs to be used in the schemes for the installations of pipeline systems in ships [Withdrawn without replacement]
- ISO/R 539:1967 Acoustics — Dimensions and conductor resistance of heat-resisting (260°C) electrical cables with copper conductors [Withdrawn without replacement]
- ISO 540:2008 Hard coal and coke — Determination of ash fusibility
- ISO/R 541:1967 Measurement of fluid flow by means of orifice plates and nozzles [Withdrawn: replaced with ISO 5167, later ISO 5167-1]
- ISO 542:1990 Oilseeds — Sampling [Withdrawn: replaced with ISO 21294]
- ISO 543:1990 Photography — Photographic films — Specifications for safety film [Withdrawn: replaced with ISO 18906]
- ISO 544:2017 Welding consumables — Technical delivery conditions for filler materials and fluxes — Type of product, dimensions, tolerances and markings
- ISO 545:1975 Filler rods, other than drawn or extruded, for welding — Lengths and tolerance [Withdrawn: replaced with ISO 544]
- ISO 546:1975 Drawn or extruded filler rods for welding, supplied in straight lengths — Lengths and tolerance [Withdrawn: replaced with ISO 544]
- ISO 547:1975 Electrodes for the welding of mild steel and low alloy high tensile steel — Lengths and tolerance [Withdrawn: replaced with ISO 544]
- ISO 548:1981 Manganese ores — Determination of barium oxide content — Barium sulphate gravimetric method
- ISO 549:1981 Manganese ores — Determination of combined water content — Gravimetric method
- ISO 550:1981 Manganese ores — Determination of titanium content [Withdrawn: replaced with ISO 7723]
- ISO 551:1975 Manganese ores — Determination of zinc content — Zinc mercurithyocyanate gravimetric method [Withdrawn without replacement]
- ISO 552:1975 Manganese ores and concentrates — Determination of calcium and magnesium contents [Withdrawn: replaced with ISO 6233]
- ISO 553:1981 Manganese ores — Determination of vanadium content — Titrimetric method and phosphotungstovanadate photometric method [Withdrawn without replacement]
- ISO 554:1976 Standard atmospheres for conditioning and/or testing — Specifications
- ISO 555 Liquid flow measurement in open channels — Dilution methods for measurement of steady flow
  - ISO 555-1:1973 Liquid flow measurement in open channels — Dilution methods for measurement of steady flow — Part 1: Constant-rate injection method [Withdrawn without replacement]
  - ISO 555-2:1987 Liquid flow measurement in open channels — Dilution methods for the measurement of steady flow — Part 2: Integration method [Withdrawn without replacement]
- ISO 556:2020 Coke (greater than 20 mm in size) — Determination of mechanical strength
- ISO/R 557:1967 Safety Signs [Withdrawn: replaced with ISO 3864-1]
- ISO 558:1980 Conditioning and testing — Standard atmospheres — Definitions
- ISO 559:1991 Steel tubes for water and sewage [Withdrawn without replacement]
- ISO 560:1975 Cold drawn precision steel tubes — Metric series — Dimensions and masses per metre [Withdrawn: replaced with ISO 4200]
- ISO 561:1989 Coal preparation plant — Graphical symbols
- ISO 562:2010 Hard coal and coke — Determination of volatile matter
- ISO 563:1981 Equipment for harvesting — Knife sections for agricultural cutter bars [Withdrawn without replacement]
- ISO/R 564:1967 Aerospace — Preformed flexible steel wire rope for aircraft controls — Dimensions and loads [Withdrawn: replaced with ISO 2020, later ISO 2020-1]
- ISO 565:1990 Test sieves — Metal wire cloth, perforated metal plate and electroformed sheet — Nominal sizes of openings
- ISO/R 566:1967 Pesticides — Common names — Sixth series of terms [Withdrawn: replaced with ISO 1750]
- ISO 567:1995 Coke — Determination of bulk density in a small container
- ISO 568:1976 Textile machinery and accessories — Heald frames for single or double row of healds — Designation of dimensions [Withdrawn: replaced with ISO 10787-1 and ISO 10787-2]
- ISO 569:1982 Textile machinery and accessories — Heald frames — Co-ordinated dimensions in relation to the pitch of the harness [Withdrawn: replaced with ISO 10787-1 and ISO 10787-2]
- ISO 570:1982 Textile machinery and accessories — Heald carrying rods for healds with closed O-shaped end loops
- ISO 571:1976 Textile machinery and accessories — Metal reeds with double-spring baulk — Dimensions [Withdrawn: Replaced with ISO 366-3]
- ISO 572:1976 Textile machinery and accessories — Shuttles for pirn changing automatic looms — Dimensions [Withdrawn without replacement]
- ISO 573:1976 Textile machinery and accessories — Dobby lags and pegs in wood, metal or other suitable material — Dimensions [Withdrawn without replacement]
- ISO 574:1979 Textile machinery and accessories — Perforated cylindrical tubes for cheese dyeing [Withdrawn: Replaced with ISO 3914-7]
- ISO 575:1978 Textile machinery and accessories — Transfer cones — Half angle of the cone 4 degrees 20' [Withdrawn without replacement]
- ISO 576:1976 Textile machinery and accessories — Paper patterns for dobbies — Dimensions [Withdrawn without replacement]
- ISO/R 577 Rolling bearings — Tapered rolling bearings — Metric series — Tolerances
  - ISO/R 577-1:1967 Rolling bearings — Tapered rolling bearings — Metric series — Tolerances — Part 1: Normal tolerances [Withdrawn: Replaced with ISO 492]
  - ISO/R 577-2:1968 Rolling bearings — Tapered rolling bearings — Metric series — Tolerances — Part 2: Tolerances classes 6 and 5 [Withdrawn: Replaced with ISO 492]
  - ISO 577-3:1973 Rolling bearings — Tapered rolling bearings — Metric series — Tolerances — Part 3: Tolerances classes 4 [Withdrawn: Replaced with ISO 492]
- ISO 578:1987 Tapered roller bearings — Inch series — Tolerances [Withdrawn without replacement]
- ISO 579:2013 Coke — Determination of total moisture
- ISO 580:2005 Plastics piping and ducting systems — Injection-moulded thermoplastics fittings — Methods for visually assessing the effects of heating
- ISO/TR 581:2005 Weldability — Metallic materials — General principles
- ISO 582:1995 Rolling bearings — Chamfer dimensions — Maximum values
- ISO 583:2007 Conveyor belts with a textile carcass — Total belt thickness and thickness of constitutive elements — Test methods
- ISO 584:1982 Plastics — Unsaturated polyester resins — Determination of reactivity at 80 degrees C (conventional method)
- ISO 585:1990 Plastics — Unplasticized cellulose acetate — Determination of moisture content
- ISO/R 586:1967 Coke — Determination of ash [Withdrawn: replaced with ISO 1171]
- ISO 587:2020 Coal and coke — Determination of chlorine using Eschka mixture
- ISO/R 588 was incorporated into ISO/R 862
- ISO 589:2008 Hard coal — Determination of total moisture
- ISO 590:1981 Oil of brazilian sassafras [Withdrawn without replacement]
- ISO 591 Titanium dioxide pigments for paints
  - ISO 591-1:2000 Part 1: Specifications and methods of test
- ISO 592:1998 Essential oils — Determination of optical rotation
- ISO 593:1974 Paper — Untrimmed stock sizes for the ISO-A Series — ISO supplementary range [Withdrawn: replaced with ISO 217]
- ISO 594 Conical fittings with a 6 % (Luer) taper for syringes, needles and certain other medical equipment
  - ISO 594-1:1986 Conical fittings with a 6 % (Luer) taper for syringes, needles and certain other medical equipment — Part 1: General requirements [Withdrawn: replaced with ISO 80369-7]
  - ISO 594-2:1998 Conical fittings with 6 % (Luer) taper for syringes, needles and certain other medical equipment — Part 2: Lock fittings [Withdrawn: replaced with ISO 80369-7]
- ISO 595 Reusable all-glass or metal-and-glass syringes for medical use [Withdrawn without replacement]
  - ISO 595-1:1986 Reusable all-glass or metal-and-glass syringes for medical use — Part 1: Dimensions [Withdrawn without replacement]
  - ISO 595-2:1987 Reusable all-glass or metal-and-glass syringes for medical use — Part 2: Design, performance requirements and tests [Withdrawn without replacement]
- ISO/R 596:1967 Hypodermic needles [Withdrawn without replacement]
- ISO/R 597:1967 Definitions and terminology of cements [Withdrawn without replacement]
- ISO/R 598:1967 Fundamental welding positions — Definitions and values of angles of slope and rotation for fillet welds for these positions [Withdrawn: replaced by ISO 6947]
- ISO 599:1985 Plastics — Polyamide homopolymers — Determination of matter extractable by boiling methanol [Withdrawn: replaced by ISO 6427]
- ISO/R 600:1967 Plastics — Polyamide homopolymers — Determination of the viscosity ratio in concentrated solution [Withdrawn without replacement]
- ISO 601:1981 Solid mineral fuels — Determination of arsenic content using the standard silver diethyldithiocarbamate photometric method of ISO 2590 [Withdrawn without replacement]
- ISO 602:2015 Coal — Determination of mineral matter
- ISO 603 Bonded abrasive products — Dimensions
  - ISO 603-1:1999 Part 1: Grinding wheels for external cylindrical grinding between centres
  - ISO 603-2:1999 Part 2: Grinding wheels for centreless external cylindrical grinding
  - ISO 603-3:1999 Part 3: Grinding wheels for internal cylindrical grinding
  - ISO 603-4:1999 Part 4: Grinding wheels for surface grinding/peripheral grinding
  - ISO 603-5:1999 Part 5: Grinding wheels for surface grinding/face grinding
  - ISO 603-6:1999 Part 6: Grinding wheels for tool and tool room grinding
  - ISO 603-7:1999 Part 7: Grinding wheels for manually guided grinding
  - ISO 603-8:1999 Part 8: Grinding wheels for deburring and fettling/snagging
  - ISO 603-9:1999 Part 9: Grinding wheels for high-pressure grinding
  - ISO 603-10:1999 Part 10: Stones for honing and superfinishings
  - ISO 603-11:1999 Part 11: Hand finishing sticks
  - ISO 603-12:1999 Part 12: Grinding wheels for deburring and fettling on a straight grinder
  - ISO 603-13:1999 Part 13: Grinding wheels for deburring and fettling on a vertical grinder
  - ISO 603-14:2022 Part 14: Grinding wheels for deburring and fettling/snagging on an angle grinder
  - ISO 603-15:2022 Part 15: Grinding wheels for cutting-off on stationary or mobile cutting-off machines
  - ISO 603-16:2022 Part 16: Grinding wheels for cutting-off on hand held power tools
  - ISO 603-17:2014 Part 17: Spindle mounted wheels (ISO type 52)
  - ISO 603-18:2013 Part 18: Grinding wheels for flat glass edge grinding machines
- ISO 604:2002 Plastics — Determination of compressive properties
- ISO 605:1991 Pulses — Determination of impurities, size, foreign odours, insects, and species and variety — Test methods
- ISO 606:2015 Short-pitch transmission precision roller and bush chains, attachments and associated chain sprockets
- ISO 607:1980 Surface active agents and detergents — Methods of sample division
- ISO/R 608:1967 Classical V-belts — Lengths (sections A, B, C, D, and E) [Withdrawn: replaced with ISO 4184]
- ISO 609:1996 Solid mineral fuels — Determination of carbon and hydrogen — High temperature combustion method
- ISO 610:1990 High-tensile steel chains (round link) for chain conveyors and coal ploughs
- ISO 611:2003 Road vehicles — Braking of automotive vehicles and their trailers — Vocabulary
- ISO 612:1978 Road vehicles — Dimensions of motor vehicles and towed vehicles — Terms and definitions
- ISO 613:2000 Ships and marine technology — Magnetic compasses, binnacles and azimuth reading devices — Class B [Withdrawn: replaced by ISO 25862]
- ISO 614:2012 Ships and marine technology — Toughened safety glass panes for rectangular windows and side scuttles — Punch method of non-destructive strength testing
- ISO/R 615:1967 Methods for determining the mechanical properties of the weld metal deposited by electrodes 3,15 mm or more in diameter [Withdrawn without replacement]
- ISO 616:1995 Coke — Determination of shatter indices
- ISO/R 617:1967 Calculation of rectangular symmetrical fillet welds statically loaded in such a way that the transverse section is not under any normal stress [Withdrawn without replacement]
- ISO 618:1974 Paper — Articles of stationery that include detachable sheets — Overall trimmed sizes [Withdrawn without replacement]
- ISO 619:1981 Manganese ores — Determination of chromium content — Diphenylcarbazide photometric method and silver persulphate titrimetric method
- ISO 620:1975 Manganese ores — Determination of zinc content — Polarographic method (zinc content between 0,005 and 0,1 %) [Withdrawn without replacement]
- ISO 621:1981 Manganese ores — Determination of metallic iron content (metallic iron content not exceeding 2 %) — Sulphosalicylic acid photometric method [Withdrawn without replacement]
- ISO 622:2016 Solid mineral fuels — Determination of phosphorus content — Reduced molybdophosphate photometric method
- ISO 623:1974 Paper and board — Folders and files — Sizes [Withdrawn without replacement]
- ISO 624:1974 Pulps — Determination of dichloromethane soluble matter [Withdrawn: replaced with ISO 14453]
- ISO 625:1996 Solid mineral fuels — Determination of carbon and hydrogen — Liebig method
- ISO/R 626:1967 Strength calculation of butt welded joints [Withdrawn without replacement]
- ISO/R 627:1967 Fundamental welding positions — Definitions and values of angles of slope and rotation for butt welds for these positions [Withdrawn: replaced by ISO 6947]
- ISO/R 628:1967 Pesticides — Common names — Seventh series of terms [Withdrawn: replaced with ISO 1750]
- ISO 629:1982 Steel and cast iron — Determination of manganese content — Spectrophotometric method
- ISO 630 Structural steels
  - ISO 630-1:2011 Part 1: General technical delivery conditions for hot-rolled products
  - ISO 630-2:2011 Part 2: Technical delivery conditions for structural steels for general purposes
  - ISO 630-3:2012 Part 3: Technical delivery conditions for fine-grain structural steels
  - ISO 630-4:2012 Part 4: Technical delivery conditions for high-yield-strength quenched and tempered structural steel plates
  - ISO 630-5:2014 Part 5: Technical delivery conditions for structural steels with improved atmospheric corrosion resistance
  - ISO 630-6:2014 Part 6: Technical delivery conditions for seismic-improved structural steels for building
- ISO 631:1975 Mosaic parquet panels — General characteristics
- ISO/R 632:1967 Methods of test for determining whether an electrode is a deep penetration electrode [Withdrawn without replacement]
- ISO 633:2019 Cork — Vocabulary
- ISO/R 634:1967 Aircraft — Methods of test for general purpose electrical cables with copper conductors [Withdrawn without replacement]
- ISO/R 635:1967 Welding consumables — Code of symbols for covered electrodes for arc welding of mild steels and low alloy high tensile steels [Withdrawn without replacement]
- ISO 636:2017 Welding consumables — Rods, wires and deposits for tungsten inert gas welding of non-alloy and fine-grain steels — Classification
- ISO 637:1975 Filler rods for gas welding of mild steels and low alloy high tensile steels — Determination of mechanical properties of deposited weld metal [Withdrawn without replacement]
- ISO 638 Paper, board, pulps and cellulosic nanomaterials — Determination of dry matter content by oven-drying method
  - ISO 638-1:2021 Part 1: Materials in solid form
  - ISO 638-2:2021 Part 2: Suspensions of cellulosic nanomaterials
- ISO 639:2023 Codes for the representation of names of languages]
- ISO 640:1984 Metallic materials — Hardness test — Calibration of standardized blocks to be used for Vickers hardness testing machines HV 0,2 to HV 100 [Withdrawn: replaced with ISO 6507-3]
  - ISO 640-2:1993 Metallic materials — Calibration of standardized blocks to be used for Vickers hardness testing machines — Part 2: Less than HV 0,2 [Withdrawn: replaced with ISO 6507-3]
- ISO 641:1975 Laboratory glassware — Interchangeable spherical ground joints
- ISO 642:1999 Steel — Hardenability test by end quenching (Jominy test)
- ISO 643:2019 Steels — Micrographic determination of the apparent grain size
- ISO/R 644:1967 Conventional signs to be used in schemes for the installations of ventilation systems in ships [Withdrawn without replacement]
- ISO/R 645:1967 Statistics — Vocabulary and symbols — First series [Withdrawn: replaced with ISO 3534]
- ISO/IEC 646:1991 Information technology — ISO 7-bit coded character set for information interchange
- ISO 647:2017 Brown coals and lignites — Determination of the yields of tar, water, gas and coke residue by low temperature distillation
- ISO 648:2008 Laboratory glassware — Single-volume pipettes
- ISO 649 Laboratory glassware — Density hydrometers for general purposes [Withdrawn without replacement]
  - ISO 649-1:1981 Part 1: Specification [Withdrawn without replacement]
  - ISO 649-2:1981 Part 2: Test methods and use [Withdrawn without replacement]
- ISO 650:1977 Relative density 60/60 degrees F hydrometers for general purposes [Withdrawn without replacement]
- ISO 651:1975 Solid-stem calorimeter thermometers [Withdrawn without replacement]
- ISO 652:1975 Enclosed-scale calorimeter thermometers [Withdrawn without replacement]
- ISO 653:1980 Long solid-stem thermometers for precision use [Withdrawn without replacement]
- ISO 654:1980 Short solid-stem thermometers for precision use [Withdrawn without replacement]
- ISO 655:1980 Long enclosed-scale thermometers for precision use [Withdrawn without replacement]
- ISO 656:1980 Short enclosed-scale thermometers for precision use [Withdrawn without replacement]
- ISO 657 Hot-rolled steel sections
- ISO 658:2002 Oilseeds — Determination of content of impurities
- ISO 659:2009 Oilseeds — Determination of oil content (Reference method)
- ISO 660:2020 Animal and vegetable fats and oils — Determination of acid value and acidity
- ISO 661:2003 Animal and vegetable fats and oils — Preparation of test sample
- ISO 662:2016 Animal and vegetable fats and oils — Determination of moisture and volatile matter content
- ISO 663:2017 Animal and vegetable fats and oils — Determination of insoluble impurities content
- ISO 664:2008 Oilseeds — Reduction of laboratory sample to test sample
- ISO 665:2020 Oilseeds — Determination of moisture and volatile matter content
- ISO 666:2012 Machine tools — Mounting of grinding wheels by means of hub flanges
- ISO 667:1981 Rubber, compounded — Determination of cure rate — Shearing disk method [Withdrawn: replaced with ISO 289-2]
- ISO 668:2020 Series 1 freight containers — Classification, dimensions and ratings
- ISO 669:2016 Resistance welding — Resistance welding equipment — Mechanical and electrical requirements
- ISO/R 670:1968 Straight resistance spot welding electrodes — Mechanical and electrical requirements [Withdrawn: replaced with ISO 5184]
- ISO 671:1982 Steel and cast iron — Determination of sulphur content — Combustion titrimetric method
- ISO 672:1978 Soaps — Determination of moisture and volatile matter content — Oven method
- ISO 673:1981 Soaps — Determination of content of ethanol-insoluble matter
- ISO 674:1988 Metallic materials — Hardness test — Calibration of standardized blocks to be used for Rockwell hardness testing machines (scales A – B – C – D – E – F – G – H – K) [Withdrawn: replaced with ISO 6508-3]
- ISO 675:2014 Textiles — Woven fabrics — Determination of dimensional change on commercial laundering near the boiling point
- ISO 676:1995 Spices and condiments — Botanical nomenclature
- ISO 677:1976 Straight bevel gears for general engineering and heavy engineering — Basic rack
- ISO 678:1976 Straight bevel gears for general engineering and heavy engineering — Modules and diametral pitches
- ISO 679:2009 Cement — Test methods — Determination of strength
- ISO 680:1990 Cement — Test methods — Chemical analysis [Withdrawn: replaced with ISO 29581-1]
- ISO/R 681:1968 Chemical analysis of cements — Minor constituents of Portland cement [Withdrawn without replacement]
- ISO/R 682:1968 Chemical analysis of cements — Determination of sulphur as sulphide [Withdrawn without replacement]
- ISO 683 Heat-treatable steels, alloy steels and free-cutting steels
  - ISO 683-1:2016 Part 1: Non-alloy steels for quenching and tempering
  - ISO 683-2:2016 Part 2: Alloy steels for quenching and tempering
  - ISO 683-3:2022 Part 3: Case-hardening steels
  - ISO 683-4:2016 Part 4: Free-cutting steels
  - ISO 683-5:2017 Part 5: Nitriding steels
  - ISO 683-6:2023 Part 6: Hot-rolled steels for quenched and tempered springs
  - ISO 683-7:2023 Part 7: Bright products of non-alloy and alloy steels
  - ISO 683-15:1992 Part 15: Valve steels for internal combustion engines
  - ISO 683-17:2023 Part 17: Ball and roller bearing steels
- ISO 684:1974 Analysis of soaps — Determination of total free alkali
- ISO 685:2020 Analysis of soaps — Determination of total alkali content and total fatty matter content
- ISO 686:1985 Photography — 35 mm filmstrips — Specifications for double-frame and single-frame formats [Withdrawn without replacement]
- ISO 687:2010 Solid mineral fuels — Coke — Determination of moisture in the general analysis test sample
- ISO 688:1975 Filler rods for braze welding — Determination of characteristics of deposited metal [Withdrawn without replacement]
- ISO 689:1975 Microcopying — ISO micromire — Description and use for checking a reading apparatus [Withdrawn without replacement]
- ISO 690:2010 Information and documentation — Guidelines for bibliographic references and citations to information resources
- ISO 691:2005 Assembly tools for screws and nuts — Wrench and socket openings — Tolerances for general use
- ISO 692:1982 Pulps — Determination of alkali solubility
- ISO 693:1982 Dimensions of seam welding wheel blanks
- ISO 694:2000 Ships and marine technology — Positioning of magnetic compasses in ships [Withdrawn: replaced by ISO 25862]
- ISO 695:1991 Glass — Resistance to attack by a boiling aqueous solution of mixed alkali — Method of test and classification
- ISO 696:1975 Surface active agents — Measurement of foaming power — Modified Ross-Miles method
- ISO 697:1981 Surface active agents — Washing powders — Determination of apparent density — Method by measuring the mass of a given volume
- ISO 698:1975 Filler rods for braze welding — Determination of conventional bond strength on steel, cast iron and other metals [Withdrawn without replacement]
- ISO 699:2015 Pulps — Determination of alkali resistance

== ISO 700 – ISO 999 ==
- ISO 700:1982 Power sources for manual metal arc welding with covered electrodes and for the TIG process [Withdrawn: replaced by IEC 60974-1:1998, now withdrawn without replacement]
- ISO 701:1998 International gear notation — Symbols for geometrical data
- ISO 702 Machine tools — Connecting dimensions of spindle noses and work holding chucks
  - ISO 702-1:2009 Part 1: Conical connection
  - ISO 702-2:2007 Part 2: Camlock type
  - ISO 702-3:2007 Part 3: Bayonet type
  - ISO 702-4:2004 Part 4: Cylindrical connection
- ISO 703:2017 Conveyor belts — Transverse flexibility (troughability) — Test method
- ISO 704:2009 Terminology work — Principles and methods
- ISO 705:2015 Rubber latex — Determination of density between 5 degrees C and 40 degrees C
- ISO 706:2004 Rubber latex — Determination of coagulum content (sieve residue)
- ISO 707:2008 Milk and milk products — Guidance on sampling
- ISO/R 708:1968 Filler rods for gas welding — Test to determine the compatibility of steel filler rods and the parent metal in the welding of steels [Withdrawn without replacement]
- ISO 709:2001 Essential oils — Determination of ester value
- ISO 710 Graphical symbols for use on detailed maps, plans and geological cross-sections
  - ISO 710-1:1974 Part 1: General rules of representation
  - ISO 710-2:1974 Part 2: Representation of sedimentary rocks
  - ISO 710-3:1974 Part 3: Representation of magmatic rocks
  - ISO 710-4:1982 Part 4: Representation of metamorphic rocks
  - ISO 710-5:1989 Part 5: Representation of minerals
  - ISO 710-6:1984 Part 6: Representation of contact rocks and rocks which have undergone metasomatic, pneumatolytic or hydrothermal transformation or transformation by weathering
  - ISO 710-7:1984 Part 7: Tectonic symbols
- ISO 711:1985 Cereals and cereal products — Determination of moisture content (Basic reference method) [Withdrawn without replacement]
- ISO 712 Cereals and cereal products — Determination of moisture content
  - ISO 712-1:2024 Part 1: Reference Method
  - ISO 712-2:2024 Part 2: Automatic drying oven method
- ISO 713:1975 Zinc — Determination of lead and cadmium contents — Polarographic method [Withdrawn without replacement]
- ISO 714:1975 Zinc — Determination of iron content — Photometric method
- ISO 715:1975 Zinc — Determination of lead content — Polarographic method [Withdrawn without replacement]
- ISO 716:1986 Metallic materials — Hardness test — Verification of Rockwell hardness testing machines (scales A – B – C – D – E – F – G – H – K) [Withdrawn: replaced with ISO 6508-2]
- ISO 717 Acoustics — Rating of sound insulation in buildings and of building elements
  - ISO 717-1:2020 Part 1: Airborne sound insulation
  - ISO 717-2:2020 Part 2: Impact sound insulation
- ISO 718:1990 Laboratory glassware — Thermal shock and thermal shock endurance — Test methods
- ISO 719:2020 Glass — Hydrolytic resistance of glass grains at 98 °C — Method of test and classification
- ISO 720:2020 Glass — Hydrolytic resistance of glass grains at 121 °C — Method of test and classification
- ISO 721:1991 Rock drilling equipment — Integral stems
- ISO 722:1991 Rock drilling equipment — Hollow drill steels in bar form, hexagonal and round
- ISO 723:1991 Rock drilling equipment — Forged collared shanks and corresponding chuck bushings for hollow hexagonal drill steels
- ISO 724:1993 ISO general-purpose metric screw threads — Basic dimensions
- ISO 725:2009 ISO inch screw threads — Basic dimensions
- ISO 726:1982 Metallic materials — Hardness test — Calibration of standardized blocks to be used for Brinell hardness testing machines [Withdrawn: replaced with ISO 6506-3]
- ISO 727 Fittings made from unplasticized poly(vinyl chloride) (PVC-U), chlorinated poly(vinyl chloride) (PVC-C) or acrylonitrile/butadiene/styrene (ABS) with plain sockets for pipes under pressure
  - ISO 727-1:2002 Part 1: Metric series
  - ISO 727-2:2005 Part 2: Inch-based series
- ISO 728:2021 Coke — Size analysis by sieving
- ISO 729:1988 Oilseeds — Determination of acidity of oils
- ISO 730:2009 Agricultural wheeled tractors — Rear-mounted three-point linkage — Categories 1N, 1, 2N, 2, 3N, 3, 4N and 4
- ISO 731 Formic acid for industrial use — Methods of test
  - ISO 731-1:1977 Formic acid for industrial use — Methods of test — Part 1: General [Withdrawn without replacement]
  - ISO 731-2:1977 Formic acid for industrial use — Methods of test — Part 2: Determination of total acidity — Titrimetric method [Withdrawn without replacement]
  - ISO 731-3:1977 Formic acid for industrial use — Methods of test — Part 3: Determination of content of other acids — Potentiometric method [Withdrawn without replacement]
  - ISO 731-4:1977 Formic acid for industrial use — Methods of test — Part 4: Visual limit test for inorganic chlorides [Withdrawn without replacement]
  - ISO 731-5:1977 Formic acid for industrial use — Methods of test — Part 5: Visual limit test for inorganic sulphates [Withdrawn without replacement]
  - ISO 731-6:1977 Formic acid for industrial use — Methods of test — Part 6: Determination of iron content — 2,2'- Bipyridyl photometric method [Withdrawn without replacement]
  - ISO 731-7:1977 Formic acid for industrial use — Methods of test — Part 7: Determination of low contents of other volatile acids — Titrimetric method after distillation [Withdrawn without replacement]
- ISO 732:2000 Photography — 120-size and 220-size films — Dimensions
- ISO/R 733:1968 Hexagon bolts and nuts — Metric series — Tolerances on widths across flats, widths across corners [Withdrawn: replaced with ISO 4759-1]
- ISO 734:2015 Oilseed meals — Determination of oil content — Extraction method with hexane (or light petroleum)
- ISO 735:1977 Oilseed residues — Determination of ash insoluble in hydrochloric acid
- ISO 736:1977 Oilseed residues — Determination of diethyl ether extract [Withdrawn without replacement]
- ISO 737:1975 Coniferous sawn timber — Sizes — Methods of measurement
- ISO 738:2015 Coniferous sawn timber — Sizes — Permissible deviations and shrinkage [Withdrawn without replacement]
- ISO 739:1976 Sodium carbonate for industrial use — Preparation and storage of test samples
- ISO 740:1976 Sodium carbonate for industrial use — Determination of total soluble alkalinity — Titrimetric method
- ISO 741:1976 Sodium carbonate for industrial use — Determination of sodium hydrogen carbonate content — Titrimetric method [Withdrawn without replacement]
- ISO 742:1973 Sodium carbonate for industrial use — Determination of chloride content — Mercurimetric method [Withdrawn without replacement]
- ISO 743:1976 Sodium carbonate for industrial use — Determination of sulphate content — Barium sulphate gravimetric method
- ISO/R 744:1968 Sodium carbonate for industrial use — Determination of iron content — 2,2'- Bipyridyl photometric method [Withdrawn without replacement]
- ISO 745:1976 Sodium carbonate for industrial use — Determination of loss of mass and of non-volatile matter at 250 degrees C [Withdrawn without replacement]
- ISO 746:1976 Sodium carbonate for industrial use — Determination of matter insoluble in water at 50 degrees C
- ISO/R 747:1968 Sodium carbonate for industrial use — Expression of test results [Withdrawn without replacement]
- ISO 748:2021 Hydrometry — Measurement of liquid flow in open channels using current-meters or floats — Velocity area methods using point velocity measurements
- ISO 749:1977 Oilseed residues — Determination of total ash
- ISO 750:1998 Fruit and vegetable products — Determination of titratable acidity
- ISO 751:1998 Fruit and vegetable products — Determination of water-insoluble solids
- ISO 752:2004 Zinc ingots
- ISO 753 Acetic acid for industrial use — Methods of test
  - ISO 753-1:1981 Part 1: General [Withdrawn without replacement]
  - ISO 753-2:1981 Part 2: Determination of acetic acid content — Titrimetric method [Withdrawn without replacement]
  - ISO 753-3:1981 Part 3: Determination of formic acid content — Iodometric method [Withdrawn without replacement]
  - ISO 753-4:1981 Part 4: Determination of acetaldehyde monomer content — Titrimetric method [Withdrawn without replacement]
  - ISO 753-5:1981 Part 5: Determination of total acetaldehyde content — Titrimetric method [Withdrawn without replacement]
  - ISO 753-6:1981 Part 6: Determination of permanganate index [Withdrawn without replacement]
  - ISO 753-7:1981 Part 7: Determination of dichromate index [Withdrawn without replacement]
  - ISO 753-8:1981 Part 8: Visual limit test for inorganic chlorides [Withdrawn without replacement]
  - ISO 753-9:1981 Part 9: Visual limit test for inorganic sulphates [Withdrawn without replacement]
  - ISO 753-10:1981 Part 10: Visual limit test for heavy metals (including iron) [Withdrawn without replacement]
- ISO 754:1982 Acetic anhydride for industrial use — Methods of test [Withdrawn without replacement]
- ISO 755 Butan-1-ol for industrial use — Methods of test
  - ISO 755-1:1981 Part 1: General [Withdrawn without replacement]
  - ISO 755-2:1981 Part 2: Determination of acidity — Titrimetric method [Withdrawn without replacement]
  - ISO 755-3:1981 Part 3: Sulphuric acid colour test [Withdrawn without replacement]
- ISO 756 Propan-2-ol for industrial use — Methods of test
  - ISO 756-1:1981 Part 1: General
  - ISO 756-2:1981 Part 2: Determination of acidity — Titrimetric method [Withdrawn without replacement]
  - ISO 756-3:1981 Part 3: Test for miscibility with water [Withdrawn without replacement]
- ISO 757 Acetone for industrial use — Methods of test
  - ISO 757-1:1982 Part 1: General [Withdrawn without replacement]
  - ISO 757-2:1982 Part 2: Determination of acidity to phenolphthalein — Titrimetric method [Withdrawn without replacement]
  - ISO 757-3:1982 Part 3: Test for miscibility with water [Withdrawn without replacement]
  - ISO 757-4:1983 Part 4: Determination of permanganate time [Withdrawn without replacement]
  - ISO 757-5:1982 Part 5: Control test with Agulhon's reagent [Withdrawn without replacement]
- ISO 758:1976 Liquid chemical products for industrial use — Determination of density at 20 degrees C
- ISO 759:1981 Volatile organic liquids for industrial use — Determination of dry residue after evaporation on water bath — General method
- ISO 760:1978 Determination of water — Karl Fischer method (General method)
- ISO 761:1977 Acetic anhydride and butan-1-ol for industrial use — Determination of bromine number [Withdrawn without replacement]
- ISO 762:2003 Fruit and vegetable products — Determination of mineral impurities content
- ISO 763:2003 Fruit and vegetable products — Determination of ash insoluble in hydrochloric acid
- ISO 764:2020 Horology — Magnetic resistant watches
- ISO 765:2016 Pesticides considered not to require common names
- ISO 766:1972 Fibre building boards — Determination of dimensions of test pieces [Withdrawn: replaced with ISO 9424]
- ISO 767:1975 Fibre building boards — Determination of moisture content [Withdrawn: replaced with ISO 9425]
- ISO 768:1972 Fibre building boards — Determination of bending strength [Withdrawn without replacement]
- ISO 769:1972 Fibre building boards — Hard and medium boards — Determination of water absorption and of swelling in thickness after immersion in water [Withdrawn without replacement]
- ISO 770:2002 Crude or rectified oils of Eucalyptus globulus (Eucalyptus globulus Labill.)
- ISO 771:1977 Oilseed residues — Determination of moisture and volatile matter content
- ISO 772:2011 Hydrometry — Vocabulary and symbols
- ISO/R 773:1969 Rectangular or square parallel keys and their corresponding keyways (Dimensions in millimetres) [Withdrawn without replacement]
- ISO/R 774:1969 Taper keys with or without gib head and their corresponding keyways (Dimensions in millimetres) [Withdrawn without replacement]
- ISO/R 775:1969 Cylindrical and 1/10 conical shaft ends [Withdrawn without replacement]
- ISO 776:2011 Pulps — Determination of acid-insoluble ash
- ISO 777:2005 Paper, board and pulp — Determination of acid-soluble calcium [Withdrawn: replaced with ISO 12830]
- ISO 778:2005 Paper, board and pulp — Determination of acid-soluble copper [Withdrawn: replaced with ISO 12830]
- ISO 779:2005 Paper, board and pulp — Determination of acid-soluble iron [Withdrawn: replaced with ISO 12830]
- ISO 780:2015 Packaging – Distribution packaging — Graphical symbols for handling and storage of packages
- ISO/R 781:1968 Measurement of fluid flow by means of Venturi tubes inserted in circular cross-section conduits running full [Withdrawn: replaced with ISO 5167, later ISO 5167-1]
- ISO 782:1975 Microcopying — Measurement of screen luminance of microfilm readers [Withdrawn without replacement, but later restored as ISO 7565]
- ISO 783:1999 Metallic materials — Tensile testing at elevated temperature [Withdrawn: replaced with ISO 6892-2]
- ISO/R 784:1968 Conventional signs to be used in schemes for the installations of sanitary systems in ships [Withdrawn without replacement]
- ISO/R 785:1968 Pesticides — Common names — Eighth series of terms [Withdrawn: replaced with ISO 1750]
- ISO/R 786:1968 Units and symbols for refrigeration [Withdrawn without replacement]
- ISO 787 General methods of test for pigments and extenders
  - ISO 787-1:1982 Part 1: Comparison of colour of pigments
  - ISO 787-2:1981 Part 2: Determination of matter volatile at 105 degrees C
  - ISO 787-3:2000 Part 3: Determination of matter soluble in water — Hot extraction method
  - ISO 787-4:1981 Part 4: Determination of acidity or alkalinity of the aqueous extract
  - ISO 787-5:1980 Part 5: Determination of oil absorption value
  - ISO 787-7:2009 Part 7: Determination of residue on sieve — Water method — Manual procedure
  - ISO 787-8:2000 Part 8: Determination of matter soluble in water — Cold extraction method
  - ISO 787-9:2019 Part 9: Determination of pH value of an aqueous suspension
  - ISO 787-10:1993 Part 10: Determination of density — Pyknometer method
  - ISO 787-11:1981 Part 11: Determination of tamped volume and apparent density after tamping
  - ISO/R 787-12:1970 Part 12: Determination of [Withdrawn without replacement]
  - ISO 787-13:2019 Part 13: Determination of water-soluble sulphates, chlorides and nitrates
  - ISO 787-14:2019 Part 14: Determination of resistivity of aqueous extract
  - ISO 787-15:2019 Part 15: Comparison of resistance to light of coloured pigments of similar types
  - ISO 787-16:1986 Part 16: Determination of relative tinting strength (or equivalent colouring value) and colour on reduction of coloured pigments — Visual comparison method
  - ISO 787-17:2019 Part 17: Comparison of lightening power of white pigments
  - ISO 787-18:1983 Part 18: Determination of residue on sieve — Mechanical flushing procedure
  - ISO 787-19:2020 Part 19: Determination of water-soluble nitrates (Salicylic acid method)
  - ISO 787-20:1979 Part 20: Comparison of ease of dispersion (Oscillatory shaking method) [Withdrawn: replaced with ISO 8780-2]
  - ISO 787-21:1979 Part 21: Comparison of heat stability of pigments using a stoving medium
  - ISO 787-22:1980 Part 22: Comparison of resistance to bleeding of pigments
  - ISO 787-23:1979 Part 23: Determination of density (using a centrifuge to remove entrained air)
  - ISO 787-24:1985 Part 24: Determination of relative tinting strength of coloured pigments and relative scattering power of white pigments — Photometric methods
  - ISO 787-25:2019 Part 25: Comparison of the colour, in full-shade systems, of white, black and coloured pigments — Colorimetric method
  - ISO 787-28:2019 Part 28: Determination of total content of polychlorinated biphenyls (PCB) by dissolution, cleanup and GC-MS
- ISO 788:2021 Ultramarine pigments
- ISO 789 Agricultural tractors — Test procedures
  - ISO 789-1:2018 Part 1: Power tests for power take-off
  - ISO 789-2:2018 Part 2: Rear three-point linkage lifting capacity
  - ISO 789-3:2015 Part 3: Turning and clearance diameters
  - ISO 789-4:1986 Part 4: Measurement of exhaust smoke
  - ISO 789-5:1983 Part 5: Partial power PTO — Non-mechanically transmitted power [Withdrawn without replacement]
  - ISO 789-6:2019 Part 6: Centre of gravity
  - ISO 789-7:1991 Part 7: Axle power determination
  - ISO 789-8:1991 Part 8: Engine air cleaner
  - ISO 789-9:2018 Part 9: Power tests for drawbar
  - ISO/OECD 789-10:2006 Part 10: Hydraulic power at tractor/implement interface
  - ISO 789-11:1996 Part 11: Steering capability of wheeled tractors
  - ISO 789-12:2000 Part 12: Low temperature starting
  - ISO 789-13:2018 Part 13: Vocabulary and specimen test report
- ISO 790:1973 Freight containers — Coding and identification [Withdrawn: replaced with ISO 6346]
- ISO 791:1973 Magnesium alloys — Determination of aluminium — 8-hydroxyquinoline gravimetric method
- ISO 792:1973 Magnesium and magnesium alloys — Determination of iron — Orthophenanthroline photometric method
- ISO 793:1973 Aluminium and aluminium alloys — Determination of iron — Orthophenanthroline photometric method
- ISO 794:1976 Magnesium and magnesium alloys — Determination of copper content — Oxalyldihydrazide photometric method
- ISO 795:1976 Aluminium and aluminium alloys — Determination of copper content — Oxalyldihydrazide photometric method
- ISO 796:1973 Aluminium alloys — Determination of copper — Electrolytic method
- ISO 797:1973 Aluminium and aluminium alloys — Determination of silicon — Gravimetric method
- ISO/R 798:1968 Chemical analysis of aluminium and its alloys — Gravimetric determination of zinc in aluminium alloys (zinc content between 0.50 and 6.5 %) [Withdrawn: replaced with ISO 1784]
- ISO 799 Ships and marine technology — Pilot ladders
  - ISO 799-1:2019 Part 1: Design and specification
  - ISO 799-2:2021 Part 2: Maintenance, use, survey, and inspection
  - ISO 799-3:2022 Part 3: Attachments and associated equipment
- ISO 800:1992 Plastics — Phenolic moulding materials — Specification [Withdrawn: replaced with ISO 14526]
- ISO 801 Pulps — Determination of saleable mass in lots
  - ISO 801-1:1994 Part 1: Pulp baled in sheet form
  - ISO 801-2:1994 Part 2: Pulps (such as flash-dried pulps) baled in slabs
  - ISO 801-3:1994 Part 3: Unitized bales
- ISO 802:1976 Aluminium oxide primarily used for the production of aluminium — Preparation and storage of test samples [Withdrawn: replaced with ISO 23028]
- ISO 803:1976 Aluminium oxide primarily used for the production of aluminium — Determination of loss of mass at 300 degrees C (conventional moisture) [Withdrawn: replaced with ISO 806]
- ISO 804:1976 Aluminium oxide primarily used for the production of aluminium — Preparation of solution for analysis — Method by alkaline fusion [Withdrawn without replacement]
- ISO 805:1976 Aluminium oxide primarily used for the production of aluminium — Determination of iron content — 1,10- Phenanthroline photometric method [Withdrawn without replacement]
- ISO 806:2004 Aluminium oxide primarily used for the production of aluminium — Determination of loss of mass at 300 degrees C and 1 000 degrees C
- ISO/R 807:1968 Chemical analysis of magnesium and magnesium alloys — Polarographic determination of zinc (zinc content between 0.1 and 4 %) [Withdrawn without replacement]
- ISO 808:1973 Aluminium and aluminium alloys — Determination of silicon — Spectrophotometric method with the reduced silicomolybdic complex
- ISO 809:1973 Magnesium and magnesium alloys — Determination of manganese — Periodate photometric method (Manganese content between 0,01 and 0,8 %)
- ISO 810:1973 Magnesium and magnesium alloys — Determination of manganese — Periodate photometric method (Manganese content less than 0,01 %)
- ISO 811:2018 Textiles — Determination of resistance to water penetration — Hydrostatic pressure test
- ISO 812:2017 Rubber, vulcanized or thermoplastic — Determination of low-temperature brittleness
- ISO 813:2019 Rubber, vulcanized or thermoplastic — Determination of adhesion to a rigid substrate — 90 degree peel method
- ISO 814:2017 Rubber, vulcanized or thermoplastic — Determination of adhesion to metal — Two-plate method
- ISO 815 Rubber, vulcanized or thermoplastic — Determination of compression set
  - ISO 815-1:2019 Part 1: At ambient or elevated temperatures
  - ISO 815-2:2019 Part 2: At low temperatures
- ISO 816:1983 Rubber, vulcanized — Determination of tear strength of small test pieces (Delft test pieces) [Withdrawn: replaced with ISO 34-2]
- ISO 817:2014 Refrigerants — Designation and safety classification
- ISO 818:1975 Fibre building boards — Definition — Classification [Withdrawn without replacement]
- ISO 819:1975 Fibre building boards — Determination of density [Withdrawn: replaced with ISO 9427]
- ISO 820:1975 Particle boards — Definition and classification [Withdrawn without replacement]
- ISO 821:1975 Particle boards — Determination of dimensions of test pieces [Withdrawn: replaced with ISO 9424]
- ISO 822:1975 Particle boards — Determination of density [Withdrawn: replaced with ISO 9427]
- ISO 823:1975 Particle boards — Determination of moisture content [Withdrawn: replaced with ISO 9425]
- ISO/R 824 Household refrigerators
  - ISO/R 824-1:1968 Part 1: Performance requirements [Withdrawn: replaced with ISO 7371]
- ISO/R 825 Household refrigerators
  - ISO/R 825-1:1968 Part 1: Special low-temperature compartments for the storage of frozen foodstuffs [Withdrawn: replaced with ISO 7371]
- ISO/R 826:1968 Mechanical property limits for rolled products of aluminium and aluminium alloys [Withdrawn without replacement]
- ISO/R 827:1968 Mechanical property limits for extruded products of aluminium and aluminium alloys [Withdrawn without replacement]
- IEC/TR 828:1988 Pin allocations for future microprocessor systems using the IEC 603-2 connector [Withdrawn without replacement]
- ISO/R 829:1968 Mechanical property limits for aluminium alloy forgings [Withdrawn without replacement]
- ISO 830:1999 Freight containers — Vocabulary
- ISO/R 831:1968 Rules for construction of stationary boilers [Withdrawn without replacement]
- ISO 832:1994 Information and documentation — Bibliographic description and references — Rules for the abbreviation of bibliographic terms
- ISO 833:1974 Information and documentation — International list of periodical word title abbreviations [Withdrawn without replacement]
- ISO 834 Fire-resistance tests — Elements of building construction
  - ISO 834-1:2025 Part 1: General requirements
  - ISO 834-2:2019 Part 2: Requirements and recommendations for measuring furnace exposure on test samples
  - ISO/TR 834-3:2012 Part 3: Commentary on test method and guide to the application of the outputs from the fire-resistance test [Withdrawn: replaced by Part 1]
  - ISO 834-4:2000 Part 4: Specific requirements for loadbearing vertical separating elements
  - ISO 834-5:2000 Part 5: Specific requirements for loadbearing horizontal separating elements
  - ISO 834-6:2000 Part 6: Specific requirements for beams
  - ISO 834-7:2000 Part 7: Specific requirements for columns
  - ISO 834-8:2002 Part 8: Specific requirements for non-loadbearing vertical separating elements
  - ISO 834-9:2003 Part 9: Specific requirements for non-loadbearing ceiling elements
  - ISO 834-10:2014 Part 10: Specific requirements to determine the contribution of applied fire protection materials to structural steel elements
  - ISO 834-11:2014 Part 11: Specific requirements for the assessment of fire protection to structural steel elements
  - ISO 834-12:2012 Part 12: Specific requirements for separating elements evaluated on less than full scale furnaces
  - ISO 834-13:2019 Part 13: Requirements for the testing and assessment of applied fire protection to steel beams with web openings
  - ISO 834-14:2019 Part 14: Requirements for the testing and assessment of applied fire protection to solid steel bar
- ISO 835:2007 Laboratory glassware — Graduated pipettes
- ISO 836:2001 Terminology for refractories
- ISO/R 837:1968 Aircraft seat rails and pins [Withdrawn: replaced with ISO 7166]
- ISO 838:1974 Paper — Holes for general filing purposes — Specifications
- ISO 839 Milling machine arbors with 7/24 tapers
  - ISO 839-1:2006 Part 1: Dimensions and designation
  - ISO 839-2:1977 Part 2: Accessories
- ISO 840:1973 Numerical control of machines — 7-bit coded character set [Withdrawn: replaced with ISO 6983-1]
- ISO 841:2001 Industrial automation systems and integration — Numerical control of machines — Coordinate system and motion nomenclature
- ISO 842:1984 Raw materials for paints and varnishes — Sampling [Withdrawn: replaced with ISO 15528]
- ISO 843:1997 Information and documentation — Conversion of Greek characters into Latin characters
- ISO 844:2014 Rigid cellular plastics — Determination of compression properties
- ISO 845:2006 Cellular plastics and rubbers — Determination of apparent density
- ISO 846:2019 Plastics — Evaluation of the action of microorganisms
- ISO/R 847:1968 Phosphoric acid for industrial use — Determination of sulphate content — Volumetric method [Withdrawn: replaced with ISO 2997]
- ISO 848:1981 Phosphoric acid for industrial use — Determination of calcium content — Titrimetric method [Withdrawn without replacement]
- ISO/R 849:1968 Phosphoric acid for industrial use — Determination of iron content — 2,2'- Bipyridyl spectrophotometric method [Withdrawn without replacement]
- ISO 850:1976 Sodium tripolyphosphate for industrial use — Determination of matter insoluble in water [Withdrawn without replacement]
- ISO 851:1976 Sodium tripolyphosphate for industrial use — Measurement of pH — Potentiometric method [Withdrawn without replacement]
- ISO/R 852:1968 Sodium tripolyphosphate and sodium pyrophosphate for industrial use — Determination of iron content — 2,2'- Bipyridyl spectrophotometric method [Withdrawn without replacement]
- ISO 853:1976 Sodium tripolyphosphate and sodium pyrophosphate for industrial use — Determination of loss on ignition [Withdrawn without replacement]
- ISO/R 854:1968 Requirements for 28-volt D.C. flat strip fuses for aircraft [Withdrawn without replacement]
- ISO 855:2003 Oil of lemon [Citrus limon (L.) Burm. f.], obtained by expression
- ISO 856:2006 Oil of peppermint (Mentha x piperita L.)
- ISO 857 Welding and allied processes — Vocabulary
  - ISO 857-2:2005 Part 2: Soldering and brazing processes and related terms
- ISO 858:1973 Fishing nets — Designation of netting yarns in the Tex System
- ISO/R 859:1968 Testing and rating room air conditioners [Withdrawn: replaced with ISO 5151]
- ISO 860:2007 Terminology work — Harmonization of concepts and terms
- ISO/R 861:1968 Hexagon socket head cap screws — Metric series [Withdrawn: replaced with ISO 4762]
- ISO 862:1984 Surface active agents — Vocabulary
- ISO 863:2008 Cement — Test methods — Pozzolanicity test for pozzolanic cements
- ISO 864:1988 Arc welding — Solid and tubular cored wires which deposit carbon and carbon manganese steel — Dimensions of wires, spools, rims and coils [Withdrawn without replacement]
- ISO 865:1981 Slots in platens for projection welding machines
- ISO 866:2016 Centre drills for centre holes without protecting chamfers — Type A
- ISO/R 867:1968 Spindle noses and face plates — Bayonet type — Sizes for interchangeability — Metric series [Withdrawn: replaced with ISO 702-3]
- ISO 868:2003 Plastics and ebonite — Determination of indentation hardness by means of a durometer (Shore hardness)
- ISO/R 869:1968 Plastics — Preparation of specimens for optical tests on plastics materials — Moulding method [Withdrawn without replacement]
- ISO/R 870:1968 Plastics — Preparation of specimens for optical tests on plastics materials — Casting method [Withdrawn without replacement]
- ISO 871:2006 Plastics — Determination of ignition temperature using a hot-air furnace
- ISO/R 872:1968 Plastics — Determination of ash of unplasticized cellulose acetate [Withdrawn: replaced with ISO 3451-3]
- ISO 873:1980 Peaches — Guide to cold storage
- ISO 874:1980 Fresh fruits and vegetables — Sampling
- ISO 875:1999 Essential oils — Evaluation of miscibility in ethanol
- ISO/R 876:1968 Special method of mechanical testing to determine the coding for deep penetration electrodes [Withdrawn without replacement]
- ISO 877 Plastics — Methods of exposure to solar radiation
  - ISO 877-1:2009 Part 1: General guidance
  - ISO 877-2:2009 Part 2: Direct weathering and exposure behind window glass
  - ISO 877-3:2018 Part 3: Intensified weathering using concentrated solar radiation
- ISO/R 878:1968 Plastics — Determination of resistance of plastics to color change upon exposure to light of the enclosed carbon arc [Withdrawn: replaced with ISO 4892]
- ISO/R 879:1968 Plastics — Determination of resistance of plastics to color change upon exposure to light of a xenon lamp [Withdrawn: replaced with ISO 4892]
- ISO 880:1981 Asbestos-cement siding shingles [Withdrawn without replacement]
- ISO 881:1980 Asbestos-cement pipes, joints and fittings for sewerage and drainage [Withdrawn without replacement]
- ISO 882 Cardamom (Elettaria cardamomum (Linnaeus) Maton var. minuscula Burkill) — Specification
  - ISO 882-1:1993 Part 1: Whole capsules
  - ISO 882-2:1993 Part 2: Seeds
- ISO 883:2013 Indexable hardmetal (carbide) inserts with rounded corners, without fixing hole — Dimensions
- ISO/R 884:1968 Pictorial marking of transit packages containing photographic materials sensitive to radiant energy [Withdrawn: replaced with ISO 780]
- ISO 885:2000 General purpose bolts and screws — Metric series — Radii under the head
- ISO 886:1973 Aluminium and aluminium alloys — Determination of manganese — Photometric method (Manganese content between 0,005 and 1,5 %)
- ISO 887:2000 Plain washers for metric bolts, screws and nuts for general purposes — General plan
- ISO 888:2012 Fasteners — Bolts, screws and studs — Nominal lengths and thread lengths
- ISO/R 889:1968 Test code for stationary steam generators of the power station type [Withdrawn without replacement]
- ISO/R 890:1968 Cinematography — Recording head gaps for two sound records on 16 mm magnetic film — Positions [Withdrawn: replaced with ISO 4242]
- ISO/R 891:1968 Cinematography — Recording head gaps for two sound records on 16 mm magnetic film — Dimensions [Withdrawn: replaced with ISO 4242]
- ISO/R 892:1968 Cinematography — Dimensions of projection reels for 8 mm motion-picture film (other than type S) [Withdrawn without replacement]
- ISO 893:1989 Surface active agents — Technical alkane sulfonates — Methods of analysis
- ISO 894:1977 Surface active agents — Technical sodium primary alkylsulphates — Methods of analysis
- ISO 895:1977 Surface active agents — Technical sodium secondary alkylsulphates — Methods of analysis
- ISO/TR 896:1977 Surface active agents — Scientific classification [Withdrawn without replacement]
- ISO 897:2000 Photography — Roll films, 126, 110 and 135-size films — Identification of the image-bearing side
- ISO 898 Mechanical properties of fasteners made of carbon steel and alloy steel
- ISO 899 Plastics — Determination of creep behaviour
  - ISO 899-1:2017 Part 1: Tensile creep
  - ISO 899-2:2003 Part 2: Flexural creep by three-point loading
- ISO 900:1977 Aluminium oxide primarily used for the production of aluminium — Determination of titanium content — Diantipyrylmethane photometric method [Withdrawn without replacement]
- ISO 901:1976 Aluminium oxide primarily used for the production of aluminium — Determination of absolute density — Pyknometer method [Withdrawn without replacement]
- ISO 902:1976 Aluminium oxide primarily used for the production of aluminium — Measurement of the angle of repose
- ISO 903:1976 Aluminium oxide primarily used for the production of aluminium — Determination of untamped density [Withdrawn without replacement]
- ISO 904:1976 Hydrochloric acid for industrial use — Determination of total acidity — Titrimetric method [Withdrawn without replacement]
- ISO 905:1976 Hydrochloric acid for industrial use — Evaluation of hydrochloric acid concentration by measurement of density [Withdrawn without replacement]
- ISO 906:1976 Hydrochloric acid for industrial use — Determination of sulphate content — Barium sulphate gravimetric method [Withdrawn without replacement]
- ISO 907:1976 Hydrochloric acid for industrial use — Determination of sulphated ash — Gravimetric method [Withdrawn without replacement]
- ISO 908:1980 Hydrochloric acid for industrial use — Determination of oxidizing or reducing substances content — Titrimetric method [Withdrawn without replacement]
- ISO/R 909:1968 Hydrochloric acid for industrial use — Determination of iron content — 2,2'- Bipyridyl spectrophotometric method [Withdrawn without replacement]
- ISO 910:1977 Sulphuric acid and oleum for industrial use — Determination of total acidity, and calculation of free sulphur trioxide content of oleum — Titrimetric method
- ISO 911:1977 Sulphuric acid for industrial use — Evaluation of sulphuric acid concentration by measurement of density [Withdrawn without replacement]
- ISO/R 912:1968 Sulphuric acid and oleum for industrial use — Determination of sulphur dioxide content — Barium sulphate gravimetric method [Withdrawn without replacement]
- ISO 913:1977 Sulphuric acid and oleum for industrial use — Determination of ash — Gravimetric method [Withdrawn without replacement]
- ISO 914:1977 Sulphuric acid and oleum for industrial use — Determination of total nitrogen content — Titrimetric method after distillation [Withdrawn without replacement]
- ISO/R 915:1968 Sulphuric acid and oleum for industrial use — Determination of iron content — 2,2'- Bipyridyl spectrophotometric method [Withdrawn without replacement]
- ISO 916:2020 Testing of refrigerating systems
- ISO 917:1989 Testing of refrigerant compressors [Withdrawn without replacement]
- ISO 918:1983 Volatile organic liquids for industrial use — Determination of distillation characteristics
- ISO/R 919:1969 Guide for the preparation of classified vocabularies (example of method) [Withdrawn: replaced with ISO 10241]
- ISO 920:1976 Wool — Determination of fibre length (barbe and hauteur) using a comb sorter
- ISO 921:1997 Nuclear energy — Vocabulary [Withdrawn without replacement]
- ISO/R 922:1969 Plastics — Polypropylene (PP) and propylene-copolymer thermoplastics — Determination of isotactic index [Withdrawn: replaced with ISO 1873-1, now replaced by ISO 9113]
- ISO 923:2000 Coal cleaning equipment — Performance evaluation
- ISO 924:1989 Coal preparation plant — Principles and conventions for flowsheets
- ISO 925:2019 Solid mineral fuels — Determination of carbonate carbon content — Gravimetric method
- ISO/R 926:1969 Solid mineral fuels — Determination of total nitrogen, sulphur, chlorine, and phosphorus — Gravimetric method [Withdrawn: replaced with ISO 333 (now withdrawn), ISO 334, ISO 352 (now withdrawn), and ISO 622]
- ISO 927:2009 Spices and condiments — Determination of extraneous matter and foreign matter content
- ISO 928:1997 Spices and condiments — Determination of total ash
- ISO 929:1980 Spices and condiments — Determination of water-insoluble ash [Withdrawn without replacement]
- ISO 930:1997 Spices and condiments — Determination of acid-insoluble ash
- ISO 931:1980 Green bananas — Guide to storage and transport
- ISO/R 932:1969 Animal fats — Determination of insoluble impurities content [Withdrawn: replaced with ISO 663]
- ISO/R 933:1969 Animal fats — Determination of moisture and volatile matter content [Withdrawn: replaced with ISO 662]
- ISO 934:1980 Animal and vegetable fats and oils — Determination of water content — Entrainment method
- ISO 935:1988 Animal and vegetable fats and oils — Determination of titre
- ISO 936:1998 Meat and meat products — Determination of total ash
- ISO 937:1978 Meat and meat products — Determination of nitrogen content (Reference method)
- ISO 938:1975 Hand-operated stillage trucks — Principal dimensions
- ISO 939:1980 Spices and condiments — Determination of moisture content — Entrainment method
- ISO 940:1979 Spices and condiments — Determination of alcohol-soluble extract [Withdrawn without replacement]
- ISO 941:1980 Spices and condiments — Determination of cold water-soluble extract
- ISO/R 942:1969 Whiteheart malleable cast iron [Withdrawn: replaced with ISO 5922]
- ISO/R 943:1969 Blackheart malleable cast iron [Withdrawn: replaced with ISO 5922]
- ISO/R 944:1969 Pearlitic malleable cast iron [Withdrawn: replaced with ISO 5922]
- ISO 945 Microstructure of cast irons
  - ISO 945-1:2019 Part 1: Graphite classification by visual analysis
  - ISO/TR 945-2:2011 Part 2: Graphite classification by image analysis
  - ISO/TR 945-3:2016 Part 3: Matrix structures
  - ISO 945-4:2019 Part 4: Test method for evaluating nodularity in spheroidal graphite cast irons
- ISO 946:1975 Grey cast iron — Beam unnotched impact test [Withdrawn without replacement]
- ISO/R 947:1969 Recommended practice for radiographic inspection of circumferential fusion welded butt joints in steel pipes up to 50 mm (2 in) wall thickness [Withdrawn: replaced with ISO 1106-3, later ISO 17636, now ISO 17636-1]
- ISO 948:1980 Spices and condiments — Sampling
- ISO 949:1987 Cauliflowers — Guide to cold storage and refrigerated transport
- ISO 950:1979 Cereals — Sampling (as grain) (Withdrawn: replaced by ISO 13690, later ISO 24333)
- ISO 951:1979 Pulses in bags — Sampling (Withdrawn: replaced by ISO 13690, later ISO 24333)
- ISO/R 952:1969 Light metal and light metal alloys — Tubes — Tensile Test [Withdrawn: replaced with ISO 6892-1]
- ISO/R 953:1969 Light metal and light metal alloys — Tubes — Drift expanding test [Withdrawn: replaced with ISO 8493]
- ISO/R 954:1969 Light metal and light metal alloys — Tubes — Bend test [Withdrawn: replaced with ISO 7438]
- ISO/R 955:1969 Aluminium and aluminium alloys — Tubes — Flattening test [Withdrawn: replaced with ISO 8492]
- ISO/R 956:1969 Light metal and light metal alloys — Wires — Tensile Test [Withdrawn: replaced with ISO 6892-1]
- ISO/R 957:1969 Aluminium and aluminium alloys — Wires — Simple torsion test [Withdrawn: replaced with ISO 7800]
- ISO/R 958:1969 Aluminium and aluminium alloys — Wires — Wrapping test [Withdrawn: replaced with ISO 7802]
- ISO 959 Pepper (Piper nigrum L.), whole or ground — Specification
  - ISO 959-1:1998 Part 1: Black pepper
  - ISO 959-2:1998 Part 2: White pepper
- ISO 960:1988 Plastics — Polyamides (PA) — Determination of water content [Withdrawn: replaced with ISO 15512]
- ISO/R 961:1969 Information processing — Implementation of the 6-bit and 7-bit coded character sets on 7- track 12,7 mm (0.5 in) magnetic tape [Withdrawn without replacement]
- ISO 962:1974 Information processing — Implementation of the 7- bit coded character set and its 7- bit and 8-bit extensions on 9- track 12,7 mm (0.5 in) magnetic tape
- ISO 963:1973 Information processing — Guide for the definition of 4- bit character sets derived from the 7- bit coded character set for information processing interchange [Withdrawn without replacement]
- ISO/R 964:1969 Shipbuilding details — Mating dimensions for pipeline flanges for ships
- ISO 965 ISO general purpose metric screw threads — Tolerances
- ISO/R 966:1969 Seeds — Sampling and methods of test [Withdrawn without replacement]
- ISO/R 967:1969 Pesticides — Common names — Ninth series of terms [Withdrawn: replaced with ISO 1750]
- ISO/R 968:1969 Pesticides — Common names — Tenth series of terms [Withdrawn: replaced with ISO 1750]
- ISO/R 969:1969 Pesticides — Common names — Eleventh series of terms [Withdrawn: replaced with ISO 1750]
- ISO/R 970:1969 Pesticides — Common names — Twelfth series of terms [Withdrawn: replaced with ISO 1750]
- ISO/R 971:1969 Pesticides — Common names — Thirteenth series of terms [Withdrawn: replaced with ISO 1750]
- ISO 972:1997 Chillies and capsicums, whole or ground (powdered) — Specification
- ISO 973:1999 Pimento (allspice) [Pimenta dioica (L.) Merr.], whole or ground — Specification
- ISO 974:2000 Plastics — Determination of the brittleness temperature by impact
- ISO 975:2021 Brown coals and lignites — Determination of yield of benzene-soluble extract — Semi-automatic method
- ISO 976:2013 Rubber and plastics — Polymer dispersions and rubber latices — Determination of pH
- ISO/R 977:1969 Sodium hydroxide for industrial use — Preparation and storage of test sample [Withdrawn: replaced with ISO 3195]
- ISO/R 978:1969 Sodium hydroxide for industrial use — Preparation of sample solution [Withdrawn: replaced with ISO 3195]
- ISO 979:1974 Sodium hydroxide for industrial use — Method of assay
- ISO 980:1976 Sodium hydroxide for industrial use — Determination of carbonates content — Gas-volumetric method [Withdrawn without replacement]
- ISO 981:1973 Sodium hydroxide for industrial use — Determination of chloride content — Mercurimetric method
- ISO 982:1976 Sodium hydroxide for industrial use — Determination of sulphate content — Barium sulphate gravimetric method [Withdrawn without replacement]
- ISO 983:1974 Sodium hydroxide for industrial use — Determination of iron content — 1,10- Phenanthroline photometric method [Withdrawn without replacement]
- ISO 984:1974 Sodium hydroxide for industrial use — Determination of silica content — Reduced silico-molybdic complex photometric method [Withdrawn without replacement]
- ISO 985:1974 Sodium hydroxide for industrial use — Determination of silica content — Gravimetric method by precipitation of quinoline molybdosilicate [Withdrawn without replacement]
- ISO 986:1976 Sodium hydroxide for industrial use — Determination of calcium content — EDTA (disodium salt) complexometric method [Withdrawn without replacement]
- ISO/R 987:1969 Sodium hydroxide for industrial use — Determination of water insoluble matter [Withdrawn without replacement]
- ISO/R 988:1969 Potassium hydroxide for industrial use — Preparation and storage of test sample [Withdrawn: replaced with ISO 2466]
- ISO/R 989:1969 Potassium hydroxide for industrial use — Preparation of sample solution [Withdrawn: replaced with ISO 2466]
- ISO 990:1974 Potassium hydroxide for industrial use — Method of assay [Withdrawn without replacement]
- ISO 991:1976 Potassium hydroxide for industrial use — Determination of carbonates content — Gas-volumetric method [Withdrawn without replacement]
- ISO 992:1975 Potassium hydroxide for industrial use — Determination of chlorides content — Mercurimetric method [Withdrawn without replacement]
- ISO 993:1976 Potassium hydroxide for industrial use — Determination of sulphate content — Barium sulphate gravimetric method [Withdrawn without replacement]
- ISO 994:1973 Potassium hydroxide for industrial use — Determination of iron content — 1,10- Phenanthroline photometric method [Withdrawn without replacement]
- ISO 995:1975 Potassium hydroxide for industrial use — Determination of silica content — Reduced silico-molybdic complex photometric method [Withdrawn without replacement]
- ISO 996:1976 Potassium hydroxide for industrial use — Determination of silica content — Gravimetric method by precipitation of quinoline molybdosilicate [Withdrawn without replacement]
- ISO 997:1976 Potassium hydroxide for industrial use — Determination of calcium content — EDTA (disodium salt) complexometric method [Withdrawn without replacement]
- ISO/R 998:1969 Potassium hydroxide for industrial use — Determination of water insoluble matter [Withdrawn without replacement]
- ISO 999:1996 Information and documentation — Guidelines for the content, organization, and presentation of indexes

== ISO 1000 – ISO 1499 ==
- ISO 1000 SI units and recommendations for the use of their multiples and of certain other units [Withdrawn 2009-11-17: replaced with ISO 80000-1]
- ISO/IEC 1001:2012 Information technology – File structure and labelling of magnetic tapes for information interchange
- ISO 1002:1983 Rolling bearings — Airframe bearings — Characteristics, boundary dimensions, tolerances, static load ratings
- ISO 1003:2008 Spices — Ginger (Zingiber officinale Roscoe) — Specification
- ISO 1004 Information processing – Magnetic ink character recognition – Print specifications
  - ISO 1004-1:2013 Part 1: Print specifications for E-13B
  - ISO 1004-2:2013 Part 2: Print specifications for CMC7
- ISO 1005 Railway rolling stock material
  - ISO 1005-1:1994 Part 1: Rough-rolled tyres for tractive and trailing stock — Technical delivery conditions
  - ISO 1005-2:1986 Part 2: Tyres, wheel centres and tyred wheels for tractive and trailing stock — Dimensional, balancing and assembly requirements
  - ISO 1005-3:1982 Part 3: Axles for tractive and trailing stock — Quality requirements
  - ISO 1005-4:1986 Part 4: Rolled or forged wheel centres for tyred wheels for tractive and trailing stock — Quality requirements
  - ISO/R 1005-5:1969 Part 5: Cast wheel centres in non-alloy steel for tyred wheels for trailer stock [Withdrawn without replacement]
  - ISO 1005-6:1994 Part 6: Solid wheels for tractive and trailing stock — Technical delivery conditions
  - ISO 1005-7:1982 Part 7: Wheelsets for tractive and trailing stock — Quality requirements
  - ISO 1005-8:1986 Part 8: Solid wheels for tractive and trailing stock — Dimensional and balancing requirements
  - ISO 1005-9:1986 Part 9: Axles for tractive and trailing stock — Dimensional requirements
- ISO 1006:1983 Building construction — Modular coordination — Basic module [Withdrawn: replaced with ISO 21723]
- ISO 1007 Photography – 135-size film and magazine – Specifications
- ISO 1008:1992 Photography — Paper dimensions — Pictorial sheets
- ISO 1009:2000 Photography — Paper dimensions — Rolls for printers
- ISO 1010:1973 Photography — Colour paper for general use — Sizes of sheet material [Withdrawn: replaced with ISO 1008]
- ISO 1011:1973 Photography — Colour paper for roll paper printers — Sizes of rolls [Withdrawn: replaced with ISO 1009]
- ISO 1012:1998 Photography — Films in sheets and rolls for general use — Dimensions
- ISO 1013:2020 Coke — Determination of bulk density in a large container
- ISO 1014 Coke
  - ISO 1014-1:2025 Part 1: Determination of apparent relative density
  - ISO 1014-2:2025 Part 2: Determination of true relative density
  - ISO 1014-3:2025 Part 3: Determination of porosity
- ISO 1015:1992 Brown coals and lignites — Determination of moisture content — Direct volumetric method [Withdrawn without replacement]
- ISO/R 1016:1969 Brown coals and lignites — Determination of ash [Withdrawn: replaced with ISO 1171]
- ISO 1017:2006 Brown coals and lignites — Determination of acetone-soluble material
- ISO 1018:2019 Hard coal — Determination of moisture-holding capacity
- ISO 1019:1982 Cinematography — Spools, daylight loading type for 16 mm motion-picture cameras — Dimensions
- ISO 1020:1974 Cinematography — Spools, daylight loading type for double-8 mm motion-picture cameras — Dimensions [Withdrawn without replacement]
- ISO 1021:1980 Aircraft — Engine nacelle fire extinguisher apertures and doors
- ISO 1022:1988 Aerospace — Gaseous oxygen replenishment connection for use in fluid systems (old type) — Dimensions (Inch series) (Not valid for new designs) [Withdrawn: replaced with ISO 8775 on 2012-04-02]
- ISO 1023:1974 Aircraft — High pressure air charging valves [Withdrawn without replacement]
- ISO 1024:1989 Metallic materials — Hardness test — Rockwell superficial test (scales 15N, 30N, 45N, 15T, 30T and 45T) [Withdrawn: replaced with ISO 6508-1]
- ISO 1025:1981 Textile machinery and accessories — Sectional beams for warp knitting machines — Terminology and main dimensions [Withdrawn: replaced with ISO 8116-5]
- ISO 1026:1982 Fruit and vegetable products — Determination of dry matter content by drying under reduced pressure and of water content by azeotropic distillation
- ISO 1027:1983 Radiographic image quality indicators for non-destructive testing — Principles and identification [Withdrawn: replaced with ISO 19232-(1-2)]
- ISO 1028:1973 Information processing — Flowchart symbols [Withdrawn: replaced with ISO 5807]
- ISO 1029:1974 Coniferous sawn timber — Defects — Classification
- ISO 1030:1975 Coniferous sawn timber — Defects — Measurement
- ISO 1031:1974 Coniferous sawn timber — Defects — Terms and definitions
- ISO 1032:1974 Coniferous sawn timber — Sizes — Terms and definitions [Withdrawn: replaced with ISO 24294]
- ISO 1033:1975 Aircraft — Dimensions for general purpose push-pull three-pole circuit-breakers
- ISO 1034:1973 Aircraft – Ground air-conditioning connections
- ISO 1035 Hot-rolled steel bars
  - ISO 1035-1 Part 1: Dimensions of round bars
  - ISO 1035-2 Part 2: Dimensions of square bars
  - ISO 1035-3 Part 3: Dimensions of flat bars
  - ISO 1035-4 Part 4: Tolerances
- ISO 1036:1984 Textile machinery — Dyeing and finishing machines — Definition of left and right sides
- ISO 1037:1982 Textile machinery and accessories — Beams for dyeing slivers and yarn — Terminology and main dimensions [Withdrawn: replaced with ISO 8116-7]
- ISO/R 1038:1969 Rolling bearings — Cylindrical rolling bearings — Radial internal clearance [Withdrawn: replaced with ISO 5753]
- ISO 1039:1995 Cinematography — Cores for motion-picture and magnetic film rolls — Dimensions
- ISO 1040:1983 Building construction — Modular coordination — Multimodules for horizontal coordinating dimensions [Withdrawn: replaced with ISO 21723]
- ISO 1041:1973 Essential oils — Determination of freezing point
- ISO 1042:1998 Laboratory glassware — One-mark volumetric flasks
- ISO 1043 Plastics — Symbols and abbreviated terms
  - ISO 1043-1:2011 Part 1: Basic polymers and their special characteristics
  - ISO 1043-2:2011 Part 2: Fillers and reinforcing materials
  - ISO 1043-3:2016 Part 3: Plasticizers
  - ISO 1043-4:2021 Part 4: Flame retardants
- ISO 1044:1993 Industrial trucks — Lead-acid traction batteries for electric trucks — Preferred voltages [Withdrawn without replacement]
- ISO/R 1045:1969 Straight resistance spot welding electrodes – Dimensions [Withdrawn: replaced with ISO 5184]
- ISO 1046:1973 Architectural and building drawings — Vocabulary [Withdrawn: replaced with ISO 10209-1, now ISO 10209]
- ISO 1047:1973 Architectural and building drawings — Presentation of drawings — Scales [Withdrawn without replacement]
- ISO 1048:1991 Photography — Exposed roll films — Identification [Withdrawn: replaced with ISO 732]
- ISO 1049:1975 Continuous mechanical handling equipment for loose bulk materials — Vibrating conveyors and feeders with rectangular or trapezoidal trough
- ISO 1050:1975 Continuous mechanical handling equipment for loose bulk materials — Screw conveyors
- ISO 1051:1999 Rivet shank diameters
- ISO 1052:1982 Steels for general engineering purposes [Withdrawn without replacement]
- ISO 1053:1975 Zinc — Determination of copper content — Spectrophotometric method [Withdrawn without replacement]
- ISO 1054:1975 Zinc — Determination of cadmium content — Polarographic method [Withdrawn without replacement]
- ISO 1055:1975 Zinc and zinc alloys — Determination of iron content — Spectrophotometric method [Withdrawn without replacement]
- ISO 1056:1975 Numerical control of machines — Punched tape block formats — Coding of preparatory functions G and miscellaneous functions M [Withdrawn: replaced with ISO 6983-1]
- ISO 1057:1973 Numerical control of machines — Interchangeable punched tape variable block format for positioning and straight-cut machining [Withdrawn: replaced with ISO 6983-1]
- ISO 1058:1973 Numerical control of machines — Punched tape variable block for positioning and straight-cut machining [Withdrawn: replaced with ISO 6983-1]
- ISO 1059:1973 Numerical control of machines — Punched tape fixed block format for positioning and straight-cut machining [Withdrawn: replaced with ISO 6983-1]
- ISO 1060 Plastics — Homopolymer and copolymer resins of vinyl chloride
  - ISO 1060-1:1998 Part 1: Designation system and basis for specifications [Withdrawn: replaced with ISO 24024-1]
  - ISO 1060-2:1998 Part 2: Preparation of test samples and determination of properties [Withdrawn: replaced with ISO 24024-2]
- ISO 1061:1990 Plastics — Unplasticized cellulose acetate — Determination of free acidity
- ISO/R 1062:1969 Pesticides — Common names — Fourteenth series of terms [Withdrawn: replaced with ISO 1750]
- ISO 1063:1974 Surface active agents — Determination of stability in hard water
- ISO 1064:1974 Surface active agents — Determination of apparent density of pastes on filling
- ISO 1065:1991 Non-ionic surface-active agents obtained from ethylene oxide and mixed non-ionic surface-active agents — Determination of cloud point
- ISO 1066:1975 Analysis of soaps — Determination of glycerol content — Titrimetric method
- ISO 1067:1974 Analysis of soaps — Determination of unsaponifiable, unsaponified and unsaponified saponifiable matter
- ISO 1068:1975 Plastics — Homopolymer and copolymer resins of vinyl chloride — Determination of compacted apparent bulk density
- ISO 1069:1973 Magnetic compasses and binnacles for sea navigation – Vocabulary
- ISO 1070:1992 Liquid flow measurement in open channels – Slope-area method
- ISO 1071:2015 Welding consumables — Covered electrodes, wires, rods and tubular cored electrodes for fusion welding of cast iron — Classification
- ISO 1072:1975 Solid wood parquet — General characteristics
- ISO 1073 Alphanumeric character sets for optical recognition
  - ISO 1073-1:1976 Part 1: Character set OCR-A – Shapes and dimensions of the printed image
  - ISO 1073-2:1976 Part 2: Character set OCR-B – Shapes and dimensions of the printed image
- ISO 1074:1991 Counterbalanced fork-lift trucks — Stability tests [Withdrawn: replaced with ISO 22915-2]
- ISO/R 1075:1969 Performance requirements for heat-resisting (190 °C) electrical cables with copper conductors for aircraft [Withdrawn without replacement]
- ISO/R 1076:1969 General purpose electric cables with aluminium or aluminium alloy conductors for aircraft [Withdrawn without replacement]
- ISO/R 1077:1969 Dimensions of elastometric toroidal sealing rings for pipe-fittings in aircraft (Inch series – Class 1 tolerances) [Withdrawn without replacement]
- ISO/R 1078:1969 Dimensions of elastometric toroidal sealing rings for aircraft (Inch series – Class 1 tolerances) [Withdrawn without replacement]
- ISO 1079:1989 Metallic materials — Hardness test — Verification of Rockwell superficial hardness testing machines (scales 15N, 30N, 45N, 15T, 30T and 45T) [Withdrawn: replaced with ISO 6508-2]
- ISO 1080:1975 Machine tools — Morse taper shanks — Cotter slots with taper keys
- ISO 1081:2013 Belt drives – V-belts and V-ribbed belts, and corresponding grooved pulleys – Vocabulary
- ISO 1082:1990 Mining — Shackle type connector units for chain conveyors
- ISO 1083:2018 Spheroidal graphite cast irons — Classification
- ISO 1084:1975 Industrial tractors — Definition and nominal rating [Withdrawn without replacement]
- ISO 1085:2016 Assembly tools for screws and nuts — Double-ended wrenches — Size pairing
- ISO 1086:1991 Information and documentation – Title leaves of books
- ISO 1087:2019 Terminology work and terminology science — Vocabulary
- ISO 1088:2007 Hydrometry – Velocity-area methods using current-meters – Collection and processing of data for determination of uncertainties in flow measurement
- ISO 1089:1980 Electrode taper fits for spot welding equipment — Dimensions
- ISO 1090:1981 Office machines and data processing equipment — Function key symbols on typewriters [Withdrawn: replaced with ISO 9995-(1,7)]
- ISO 1091:1977 Typewriters — Layout of printing and function keys [Withdrawn: replaced with ISO 9995-(1,7)]
- ISO 1092
  - ISO 1092-1:1974 Adding machines and calculating machines — Numeric section of ten-key keyboards [Withdrawn: replaced with ISO 9995-(1,7)]
- ISO 1093:1981 Adding machines and calculating machines — Keytop and printed or displayed symbols [Withdrawn: replaced with ISO 9995-(1,7)]
- ISO/R 1094:1969 Adding machines and calculating machines — Classification [Withdrawn without replacement]
- ISO 1095:1989 Shipbuilding and marine structures — Toughened safety glass panes for side scuttles [Withdrawn: replaced with ISO 21005]
- ISO 1096:2021 Plywood — Classification
- ISO 1097:1975 Plywood — Measurement of dimensions of panels [Withdrawn without replacement]
- ISO 1098:1975 Veneer plywood for general use — General requirements [Withdrawn without replacement]
- ISO 1099:2017 Metallic materials — Fatigue testing — Axial force-controlled method [Withdrawn without replacement]
- ISO 1100 Hydrometry – Measurement of liquid flow in open channels
  - ISO 1100-1:1996 Part 1: Establishment and operation of a gauging station [Withdrawn: replaced with ISO 18365]
  - ISO 1100-2:2010 Part 2: Determination of the stage-discharge relationship [Withdrawn: replaced with ISO 18320]
- ISO 1101:2017 Geometrical product specifications (GPS) – Geometrical tolerancing – Tolerances of form, orientation, location and run-out
- ISO 1102:2001 Commercial road vehicles — 50 mm drawbar eye — Interchangeability
- ISO 1103:2007 Road vehicles — Coupling balls for caravans and light trailers — Dimensions
- ISO 1104:1977 Surface active agents — Technical sodium alkylarylsulphonates (excluding benzene derivatives) — Methods of analysis
- ISO/R 1105:1969 Pesticides considered not to require common names — Second list [Withdrawn: replaced with ISO 765]
- ISO 1106 Recommended practice for radiographic examination of fusion welded joints
  - ISO 1106-1:1984 Part 1: Fusion welded butt joints in steel plates up to 50 mm thick [Withdrawn: replaced with ISO 17636]
  - ISO 1106-2:1985 Part 2: Fusion welded butt joints in steel plates thicker than 50 mm and up to and including 200 mm in thickness [Withdrawn: replaced with ISO 17636]
  - ISO 1106-3:1984 Part 3: Fusion welded circumferential joints in steel pipes of up to 50 mm wall thickness [Withdrawn: replaced with ISO 17636]
- ISO 1107:2017 Fishing nets – Netting – Basic terms and definitions
- ISO 1108:1992 Spices and condiments — Determination of non-volatile ether extract
- ISO 1109:1975 Refractory products — Classification of dense shaped refractory products [Withdrawn: replaced with ISO 10081-1]
- ISO 1110:2019 Plastics — Polyamides — Accelerated conditioning of test specimens
- ISO 1111 Single cold-reduced tinplate and single cold-reduced blackplate
  - ISO 1111-1:1983 Part 1: Electrolytic and hot-dipped tinplate sheet and blackplate sheet [Withdrawn: replaced with ISO 11949]
  - ISO 1111-2:1983 Part 2: Electrolytic tinplate coil and blackplate coil for subsequent cutting into sheet form [Withdrawn: replaced with ISO 11949]
- ISO 1112:2009 Horology – Functional and non-functional jewels
- ISO 1113:1979 Information processing – Representation of the 7- bit coded character set on punched tape
- ISO 1114:1977 Cocoa beans — Cut test [Withdrawn: replaced with ISO 2451]
- ISO/R 1115:1969 Finishes with the external screw thread for glass containers and gauges for inspection of screw closures [Withdrawn without replacement]
- ISO 1116:1999 Micrographics — 16 mm and 35 mm microfilm spools and reels — Specifications [Withdrawn without replacement]
- ISO 1117:1975 Bonded abrasive products — Grinding-wheel dimensions (Part 2) [Withdrawn: replaced with ISO 603-(1-16)]
- ISO 1118:1978 Aluminium and aluminium alloys — Determination of titanium — Spectrophotometric chromotropic acid method
- ISO 1119:2011 Geometrical product specifications (GPS) – Series of conical tapers and taper angles
- ISO 1120:2012 Conveyor belts — Determination of strength of mechanical fastenings — Static test method
- ISO 1121:1976 Conveyor belts — List of characteristics which may be required according to use [Withdrawn without replacement]
- ISO 1122 Vocabulary of gear terms
  - ISO 1122-1:1998 Part 1: Definitions related to geometry
  - ISO 1122-2:1999 Part 2: Definitions related to worm gear geometry
- ISO 1123:1976 Tapered roller bearings — Inch series — Chamfer dimension limits [Withdrawn without replacement]
- ISO 1124:1988 Rubber compounding ingredients — Carbon black shipment sampling procedures
- ISO 1125:2015 Rubber compounding ingredients — Carbon black — Determination of ash
- ISO 1126:2015 Rubber compounding ingredients — Carbon black — Determination of loss on heating
- ISO 1127:1992 Stainless steel tubes — Dimensions, tolerances and conventional masses per unit length
- ISO/R 1128:1969 Steel tubes — Butt-welding bends 5D (90° and 180°) [Withdrawn: replaced with ISO 3419]
- ISO 1129:1980 Steel tubes for boilers, superheaters and heat exchangers — Dimensions, tolerances and conventional masses per unit length [Withdrawn without replacement]
- ISO 1130:1975 Textile fibres — Some methods of sampling for testing
- ISO 1131:1976 Textile machinery and accessories — Weft pirns for box-loaders for automatic looms — Dimensions of pirn tip [Withdrawn without replacement]
- ISO 1132 Rolling bearings – Tolerances
  - ISO 1132-1:2000 Part 1: Terms and definitions
  - ISO 1132-2:2001 Part 2: Measuring and gauging principles and methods
- ISO 1133 Plastics — Determination of the melt mass-flow rate (MFR) and melt volume-flow rate (MVR) of thermoplastics
  - ISO 1133-1:2011 Part 1: Standard method
  - ISO 1133-2:2011 Part 2: Method for materials sensitive to time-temperature history and/or moisture
- ISO 1134:1993 Pears — Cold storage
- ISO 1135 Transfusion equipment for medical use
  - ISO 1135-1:1987 Part 1: Glass transfusion bottles, closures and caps [Withdrawn without replacement]
  - ISO 1135-3:2016 Part 3: Blood-taking sets for single use
  - ISO 1135-4:2015 Part 4: Transfusion sets for single use, gravity feed
  - ISO 1135-5:2015 Part 5: Transfusion sets for single use with pressure infusion apparatus
- ISO 1136:2015 Wool — Determination of mean diameter of fibres — Air permeability method
- ISO 1137:1975 Plastics — Determination of behaviour in a ventilated tubular oven [Withdrawn without replacement]
- ISO 1138:2022 Rubber compounding ingredients — Carbon black — Determination of sulfur content
- ISO 1139:1973 Textiles — Designation of yarns
- ISO 1140:2021 Fibre ropes — Polyamide — 3-, 4-, 8- and 12-strand ropes
- ISO 1141:2021 Fibre ropes — Polyester — 3-, 4-, 8- and 12-strand ropes
- ISO 1142:1973 Ropes — Sampling and conditioning for testing [Withdrawn: replaced with ISO 2307]
- ISO 1143:2021 Metallic materials — Rotating bar bending fatigue testing
- ISO 1144:2016 Textiles — Universal system for designating linear density (Tex System)
- ISO/R 1145:1969 Refractory arch bricks — Dimensions [Withdrawn: replaced with ISO 5019-2]
- ISO 1146:1988 Pyrometric reference cones for laboratory use – Specification
- ISO 1147:1995 Plastics/rubber — Polymer dispersions and synthetic rubber latices — Freeze-thaw cycle stability test
- ISO 1148:1980 Plastics — Aqueous dispersions of polymers and copolymers — Determination of pH [Withdrawn: replaced with ISO 976]
- ISO/R 1149:1969 Layout of multilingual classified vocabularies [Withdrawn: replaced with ISO 10241]
- ISO 1150:1997 Textile machinery and accessories — Drop wires for warp stop motions for weaving machines with automatic drawing-in
- ISO 1151 Flight dynamics – Concepts, quantities and symbols
  - ISO 1151-1:1988 Part 1: Aircraft motion relative to the air
  - ISO 1151-2:1985 Part 2: Motions of the aircraft and the atmosphere relative to the Earth [Withdrawn without replacement]
  - ISO 1151-3:1989 Part 3: Derivatives of forces, moments and their coefficients
  - ISO 1151-4:1994 Part 4: Concepts and quantities used in the study of aircraft stability and control [Withdrawn without replacement]
  - ISO 1151-5:1987 Part 5: Quantities used in measurements [Withdrawn without replacement]
  - ISO 1151-6:1982 Part 6: Aircraft geometry
  - ISO 1151-7:1985 Part 7: Flight points and flight envelopes
  - ISO 1151-8:1992 Part 8: Concepts and quantities used in the study of the dynamic behaviour of the aircraft
  - ISO 1151-9:1993 Part 9: Models of atmospheric motions along the trajectory of the aircraft [Withdrawn without replacement]
- ISO 1152:1974 Flight dynamics – Concepts, quantities and symbols – Part 2: Motions of the aircraft and the atmosphere relative to the Earth [Renamed ISO 1151-2]
- ISO 1153:1972 Flight dynamics – Concepts, quantities and symbols – Part 3: Derivatives of forces, moments and their coefficients [Renamed ISO 1151-3]
- ISO 1154:1975 Information processing – Punched paper tape – Dimensions and location of feed holes and code holes
- ISO 1155:1978 Information processing – Use of longitudinal parity to detect errors in information messages
- ISO/R 1156:1969 Shipbuilding details – Wrought aluminium alloys for use in shipbuilding [Withdrawn without replacement]
- ISO 1157:1990 Plastics — Cellulose acetate in dilute solution — Determination of viscosity number and viscosity ratio [Withdrawn without replacement]
- ISO 1158:1998 Plastics — Vinyl chloride homopolymers and copolymers — Determination of chlorine content
- ISO 1159:1978 Plastics — Vinyl chloride-vinyl acetate copolymers — Determination of vinyl acetate [Withdrawn without replacement]
- ISO 1160:1976 Rolling bearings for railway axle-boxes — Acceptance inspection [Withdrawn without replacement]
- ISO 1161:2016 Series 1 freight containers — Corner and intermediate fittings — Specifications
- ISO 1162:1975 Cereals and pulses — Method of test for infestation by X-ray examination [Withdrawn: replaced with ISO 6639-4]
- ISO 1163 Plastics — Unplasticized poly(vinyl chloride) (PVC-U) moulding and extrusion materials
  - ISO 1163-1:1995 Part 1: Designation system and basis for specifications [Withdrawn: replaced with ISO 21306-1]
  - ISO 1163-2:1995 Part 2: Preparation of test specimens and determination of properties [Withdrawn: replaced with ISO 21306-2]
- ISO/R 1164:1970 Polyethylene (PE) pipes — Tolerances on outside diameters [Withdrawn: replaced with ISO 3607, now ISO 11922-(1-2)]
- ISO/R 1165:1970 Unplasticized polyvinyl chloride (PVC) pipes — Tolerances on wall thicknesses up to 6 mm [Withdrawn: replaced with ISO 3606, now ISO 11922-(1-2)]
- ISO/R 1166:1970 Polyethylene (PE) pipes — Tolerances on wall thicknesses up to 6 mm [Withdrawn: replaced with ISO 3607, now ISO 11922-(1-2)]
- ISO 1167 Thermoplastics pipes, fittings and assemblies for the conveyance of fluids — Determination of the resistance to internal pressure
  - ISO 1167-1:2006 Part 1: General method
  - ISO 1167-2:2006 Part 2: Preparation of pipe test pieces
- ISO 1168:1973 Combine harvesters — Width of cut and number of knife sections [Withdrawn without replacement]
- ISO 1169:2006 Zinc alloys — Determination of aluminium content — Titrimetric method
- ISO 1170:2020 Coal and coke — Calculation of analyses to different bases
- ISO 1171:2010 Solid mineral fuels — Determination of ash
- ISO 1172:1996 Textile-glass-reinforced plastics — Prepregs, moulding compounds and laminates — Determination of the textile-glass and mineral-filler content — Calcination methods
- ISO 1173:2001 Assembly tools for screws and nuts — Drive ends for hand- and machine-operated screwdriver bits and connecting parts — Dimensions, torque testing
- ISO 1174 Assembly tools for screws and nuts — Driving squares
  - ISO 1174-1:2011 Part 1: Driving squares for hand socket tools
  - ISO 1174-2:1996 Part 2: Driving squares for power socket tools
- ISO 1175:1976 Shipbuilding — Dimensions and sectional properties of aluminium alloy sections for marine use [Withdrawn without replacement]
- ISO 1176:1990 Road vehicles – Masses – Vocabulary and codes
- ISO 1177:1985 Information processing – Character structure for start/stop and synchronous character oriented transmission
- ISO 1178:1976 Magnesium alloys — Determination of soluble zirconium — Alizarin sulphonate photometric method
- ISO 1179 Connections for general use and fluid power — Ports and stud ends with ISO 228-1 threads with elastomeric or metal-to-metal sealing
  - ISO 1179-1:2013 Part 1: Threaded ports
  - ISO 1179-2:2013 Part 2: Heavy-duty (S series) and light-duty (L series) stud ends with elastomeric sealing (type E)
  - ISO 1179-3:2007 Part 3: Light-duty (L series) stud ends with sealing by O-ring with retaining ring (types G and H)
  - ISO 1179-4:2007 Part 4: Stud ends for general use only with metal-to-metal sealing (type B)
- ISO 1180:1983 Shanks for pneumatic tools and fitting dimensions of chuck bushings
- ISO 1181:2004 Fibre ropes — Manila and sisal — 3-, 4- and 8-strand ropes
- ISO 1182:2020 Reaction to fire tests for products—Non-combustibility test
- ISO 1183 Plastics — Methods for determining the density of non-cellular plastics
  - ISO 1183-1:2019 Part 1: Immersion method, liquid pycnometer method and titration method
  - ISO 1183-2:2019 Part 2: Density gradient column method
  - ISO 1183-3:1999 Part 3: Gas pyknometer method
- ISO 1184:1983 Plastics — Determination of tensile properties of films [Withdrawn: replaced with ISO 527-3]
- ISO 1185:2003 Road vehicles — Connectors for the electrical connection of towing and towed vehicles — 7-pole connector type 24 N (normal) for vehicles with 24 V nominal supply voltage
- ISO/R 1186:1970 Pressures in brake lines and braking efficiency [Withdrawn without replacement]
- ISO 1187:1983 Special wrought copper alloys — Chemical composition and forms of wrought products [Withdrawn without replacement]
- ISO 1188:1984 Cinematography — Recorded characteristic for magnetic sound on full-coat 16 mm motion-picture film — Specifications
- ISO 1189:1986 Cinematography — Recorded characteristic for magnetic sound records on 35 mm motion-picture film excluding striped release prints — Specifications
- ISO 1190 Copper and copper alloys — Code of designation
  - ISO 1190-1:1982 Part 1: Designation of materials
  - ISO 1190-2:1982 Part 2: Designation of tempers
- ISO 1191:1975 Plastics — Polyethylenes and polypropylenes in dilute solution — Determination of viscosity number and of limiting viscosity number [Withdrawn: replaced with ISO 1628-3]
- ISO 1193:1973 Butter triers [Withdrawn: replaced with ISO 707]
- ISO 1194:1973 Cheese triers [Withdrawn: replaced with ISO 707]
- ISO/R 1195:1970 Plastics — Determination of the water vapour transmission rate of plastics films and thin sheets — Dish method [Withdrawn without replacement]
- ISO 1198:1972 Sealed-beam landing lamps for aircraft — Dimensions
- ISO/R 1200:1971 Cinematography — Labelling of containers for unexposed motion-picture films and magnetic films — Minimum information specifications [Withdrawn: replaced with ISO 3042]
- ISO 1201:1972 Cinematography — 8 mm motion-picture film with picture — Location and width of magnetic striping and gaps of recording and reproducing magnetic heads for magnetic sound record [Withdrawn without replacement]
- ISO 1202:1981 Essential oils — Determination of 1,8-cineole content [Withdrawn without replacement]
- ISO 1203:1998 Photography — Roll film cameras — Back window location
- ISO 1204:1990 Reciprocating internal combustion engines — Designation of the direction of rotation and of cylinders and valves in cylinder heads, and definition of right-hand and left-hand in-line engines and locations on an engine
- ISO 1205:1972 Reciprocating internal combustion engines — Designation of the cylinders [Withdrawn: replaced with ISO 1204]
- ISO 1206:2018 Rolling bearings — Needle roller bearings with machined rings — Boundary dimensions, geometrical product specifications (GPS) and tolerance values
- ISO 1207:2011 Slotted cheese head screws — Product grade A
- ISO 1208:1982 Spices and condiments — Determination of filth
- ISO 1209 Rigid cellular plastics — Determination of flexural properties
  - ISO 1209-1:2007 Part 1: Basic bending test
  - ISO 1209-2:2007 Part 2: Determination of flexural strength and apparent flexural modulus of elasticity
- ISO 1210:1992 Plastics — Determination of the burning behaviour of horizontal and vertical specimens in contact with a small-flame ignition source [Withdrawn: replaced with IEC 60695-11-10]
- ISO 1211:2010 Milk — Determination of fat content — Gravimetric method (Reference method) [Withdrawn: replaced with ISO 23318]
- ISO 1212:1995 Apples — Cold storage
- ISO 1213 Solid mineral fuels – Vocabulary
  - ISO 1213-1:2020 Part 1: Terms relating to coal preparation
  - ISO 1213-2:2016 Part 2: Terms relating to sampling, testing and analysis
  - ISO/R 1213-3 Vocabulary of terms relating to solid mineral fuels — Part 3: Terms relating to coke [Withdrawn: replaced with ISO 1213-2]
- ISO/R 1214:1971 Counterbalanced fork lift trucks — Rated capacity [Withdrawn without replacement]
- ISO 1215:2015 Virgin cork, raw reproduction cork, ramassage, gleanings, burnt cork, corkwaste, boiled cork pieces and raw corkwaste — Definitions and packaging
- ISO 1216:2017 Boiled reproduction cork — Grading, classification and packing
- ISO 1217:2009 Displacement compressors—Acceptance tests
- ISO 1218:1975 Plastics — Polyamides — Determination of "melting point" [Withdrawn: replaced with ISO 3146]
- ISO 1219 Fluid power systems and components – Graphical symbols and circuit diagrams
  - ISO 1219-1:2012 Part 1: Graphical symbols for conventional use and data-processing applications
  - ISO 1219-2:2012 Part 2: Circuit diagrams
  - ISO 1219-3:2016 Part 3: Symbol modules and connected symbols in circuit diagrams
- ISO/R 1220:1970 Methods of test for heat-resisting (190 °C) electrical cables with copper conductors for aircraft [Withdrawn without replacement]
- ISO 1222 Photography – Tripod connections
- ISO 1223:2003 Cinematography — Picture areas for motion-picture films for television — Position and dimensions
- ISO 1224 Rolling bearings — Instrument precision bearings
  - ISO 1224-1:2007 Part 1: Boundary dimensions, tolerances and characteristics of metric series bearings [Withdrawn without replacement]
  - ISO 1224-2:2007 Part 2: Boundary dimensions, tolerances and characteristics of inch series bearings [Withdrawn without replacement]
- ISO/R 1225 was merged into ISO/R 1224.
- ISO/R 1226:1970 Symbolic designation of direction of closing and faces of doors, windows and shutters [Withdrawn without replacement]
- ISO 1227:1979 Starch, including derivatives and by-products — Vocabulary [Withdrawn without replacement]
- ISO 1228:1975 Plastics — Poly(ethylene terephthalate) in dilute solution — Determination of viscosity number [Withdrawn: replaced with ISO 1628-5]
- ISO 1229:1989 Photography — Expendable photoflash lamps — Determination of light output [Withdrawn without replacement]
- ISO 1230:2007 Photography — Determination of flash guide numbers for electronic flash equipment
- ISO/R 1231:1970 Seat belt assemblies for motorists [Withdrawn without replacement]
- ISO 1232:1976 Aluminium oxide primarily used for the production of aluminium — Determination of silica content — Reduced molybdosilicate spectrophotometric method [Withdrawn without replacement]
- ISO 1233:1975 Plastics — Determination of viscosity number of methyl methacrylate polymers and copolymers in dilute solution [Withdrawn: replaced with ISO 1628-6]
- ISO 1234:1997 Split pins
- ISO 1237:1981 Mustard seed — Specification
- ISO 1241:1996 Essential oils — Determination of ester values, before and after acetylation, and evaluation of the contents of free and total alcohols
- ISO 1242:1999 Essential oils — Determination of acid value
- ISO 1247 Aluminium pigments for paints
  - ISO 1247-1:2021 Part 1: General aluminium pigments
  - ISO 1247-2:2021 Part 2: Vacuum metallized aluminium pigments
- ISO 1248:2006 Iron oxide pigments — Specifications and methods of test
- ISO 1249:1974 Zinc chromate pigments — Basic zinc potassium chromate pigments and zinc tetrahydroxychromate pigments
- ISO 1250:1972 Mineral solvents for paints — White spirits and related hydrocarbon solvents
- ISO/R 1260:1970 Guide to the use of ISO/R 390 "Sampling and inspection of asbestos-cement products" [Withdrawn: replaced with ISO 390]
- ISO 1264:1980 Plastics — Homopolymer and copolymer resins of vinyl chloride — Determination of pH of aqueous extract
- ISO 1265:2007 Plastics — Poly(vinyl chloride) resins — Determination of number of impurities and foreign particles
- ISO 1268 Fibre-reinforced plastics – Methods of producing test plates
- ISO 1269:2006 Plastics — Homopolymer and copolymer resins of vinyl chloride — Determination of volatile matter (including water)
- ISO 1270:1975 Plastics — PVC resins — Determination of ash and sulphated ash [Withdrawn: replaced with ISO 3451-5]
- ISO 1271:1983 Essential oils — Determination of carbonyl value — Free hydroxylamine method
- ISO 1272:2000 Essential oils — Determination of content of phenols
- ISO 1275:2006 Double-pitch precision roller chains, attachments and associated chain sprockets for transmission and conveyors
- ISO 1279:1996 Essential oils — Determination of carbonyl value — Potentiometric methods using hydroxylammonium chloride
- ISO/TR 1281 Rolling bearings — Explanatory notes on ISO 281
  - ISO/TR 1281-1:2021 Part 1: Basic dynamic load rating and basic rating life
  - ISO/TR 1281-2:2008 Part 2: Modified rating life calculation, based on a systems approach to fatigue stresses
- ISO/R 1283 Brown coals and lignites — Determination of ash [Draft numbered ISO 1016]
- ISO 1288:2016 Glass in building — Determination of the bending strength of glass
  - ISO 1288-1:2016 Part 1: Fundamentals of testing glass
  - ISO 1288-2:2016 Part 2: Coaxial double-ring test on flat specimens with large test surface areas
  - ISO 1288-3:2016 Part 3: Test with specimen supported at two points (four point bending)
  - ISO 1288-4:2016 Part 4: Testing of channel shaped glass
  - ISO 1288-5:2016 Part 5: Coaxial double ring test on flat specimens with small test surface areas
- ISO/R 1291 Pesticides — Common names — Ninth series of terms [Draft numbered ISO/R 967]
- ISO/R 1292 Pesticides — Common names — Eleventh series of terms [Draft numbered ISO/R 969]
- ISO/R 1295:1970 Paper vocabulary — Fifth series of terms [Withdrawn: Replaced with ISO 4046]
- ISO 1302:2002 Geometrical Product Specifications (GPS) – Indication of surface texture in technical product documentation [Withdrawn: Replaced with ISO 21920-1]
- ISO 1304:2016 Rubber compounding ingredients — Carbon black — Determination of iodine adsorption number
- ISO 1306:1995 Rubber compounding ingredients — Carbon black (pelletized) — Determination of pour density
- ISO 1307:2006 Rubber and plastics hoses — Hose sizes, minimum and maximum inside diameters, and tolerances on cut-to-length hoses
- ISO 1310:1974 Carbon black for use in the rubber industry — Sampling packaged shipments [Withdrawn: Replaced with ISO 1124]
- ISO/R 1311 Shipbuilding details — Mating dimensions for pipeline flanges for ships [Draft numbered ISO/R 964]
- ISO/R 1312 Pesticides — Common names — Twelfth series of terms [Draft numbered ISO/R 970]
- ISO/R 1313 Pesticides — Common names — Thirteenth series of terms [Draft numbered ISO/R 971]
- ISO 1324:1985 Solid wood parquet — Classification of oak strips [Withdrawn: replaced with ISO 4562]
- ISO 1325:1973 Plastics — Determination of electrical properties of thin sheet and film [Withdrawn without replacement]
- ISO/R 1326:1970 Plastics — Determination of flammability and burning rate of plastics in the form of film [Withdrawn: Replaced with ISO 9773]
- ISO 1328 Cylindrical gears — ISO system of flank tolerance classification
  - ISO 1328-1:2013 Part 1: Definitions and allowable values of deviations relevant to flanks of gear teeth
  - ISO 1328-2:2020 Part 2: Definitions and allowable values of double flank radial composite deviations
- ISO/R 1330:1970 Unplasticized polyvinyl chloride (PVC) pipes — Tolerances on outside diameters [Withdrawn: replaced with ISO 3606, now ISO 11922-(1-2)]
- ISO/DIS 1331, 1332, and 1333 became ISO/R 1164, 1165, and 1166, respectively, meaning these numbers are unused.
- ISO 1336:1980 Wrought coppers (having minimum copper contents of 97,5 %) — Chemical composition and forms of wrought products [Withdrawn without replacement]
- ISO 1337:1980 Wrought coppers (having minimum copper contents of 99,85 %) — Chemical composition and forms of wrought products [Withdrawn without replacement]
- ISO 1338:1977 Cast copper alloys — Composition and mechanical properties [Withdrawn without replacement]
- ISO 1340:1976 Cylindrical gears — Information to be given to the manufacturer by the purchaser in order to obtain the gear required [Withdrawn without replacement]
- ISO 1341:1976 Straight bevel gears — Information to be given to the manufacturer by the purchaser in order to obtain the gear required [Withdrawn without replacement]
- ISO 1342:2012 Essential oil of rosemary (Rosmarinus officinalis L.)
- ISO 1346:2021 Fibre ropes — Polypropylene split film, monofilament and multifilament (PP2) and polypropylene high-tenacity multifilament (PP3) — 3-, 4-, 8- and 12-strand ropes
- ISO 1352:2021 Metallic materials — Torque-controlled fatigue testing
- ISO/R 1353 Metallic materials — Hardness test — Rockwell superficial test (scales 15N, 30N, 45N, 15T, 30T and 45T) [Draft numbered ISO 1024]
- ISO 1355:1989 Metallic materials — Hardness test — Calibration of standardized blocks to be used for Rockwell superficial hardness testing machines (scales 15N, 30N, 45N, 15T, 30T and 45T) [Withdrawn: replaced with ISO 6508-3]
- ISO/R 1359 Heat-treated steels, alloy steels and free-cutting steels – Part 4: Wrought, quenched, and tempered steels with 1 % chromium and 0.2 % molybdenum and controlled sulphur content [Renamed ISO/R 683-4]
- ISO/R 1360 Heat-treated steels, alloy steels and free-cutting steels – Part 5: Wrought quenched and tempered manganese steels [Draft renamed ISO/R 683-5]
- ISO 1361:1997 Light-gauge metal containers — Round open-top cans — Internal diameters [Withdrawn without replacement]
- ISO/R 1362 Heat-treated steels, alloy steels and free-cutting steels – Part 7: Wrought quenched and tempered chromium steels [Draft renamed ISO/R 683-7]
- ISO/R 1364 Heat-treated steels, alloy steels and free-cutting steels – Part 9: Wrought free-cutting steels [Draft renamed ISO/R 683-9]
- ISO/R 1366 Heat-treated steels, alloy steels and free-cutting steels – Part 11: Wrought case hardening steels [Draft renamed ISO/R 683-11]
- ISO/R 1376 Railway rolling stock material – Rough tyres for trailer stock Dimensions and tolerances [Draft renamed ISO/R 1005-2]
- ISO/R 1378 Railway rolling stock material – Rolled or forged wheel centres for tyred wheels for trailer stock [Draft renamed ISO/R 1005-4]
- ISO/R 1379 Railway rolling stock material – Cast wheel centres in non-alloy steel for tyred wheels for trailer stock [Draft renamed ISO/R 1005-5]
- ISO 1382:2020 Rubber – Vocabulary
- ISO 1385 Phthalate esters for industrial use — Methods of test
- ISO 1385-1:1977 Part 1: General
- ISO 1385-2:1977 Part 2: Measurement of colour after heat treatment (Diallyl phthalate excluded) [Withdrawn without replacement]
- ISO 1385-3:1977 Part 3: Determination of ash [Withdrawn without replacement]
- ISO 1385-4:1977 Part 4: Titrimetric method [Withdrawn without replacement]
- ISO 1385-5:1977 Part 5: Determination of ester content — Titrimetric method after saponification [Withdrawn without replacement]
- ISO 1386:1983 Solvent acetates for industrial use — Methods of test [Withdrawn without replacement]
- ISO 1387:1982 Methanol for industrial use — Methods of test [Withdrawn without replacement]
- ISO 1388 Ethanol for industrial use — Methods of test
  - ISO 1388-1:1981 Part 1: General
  - ISO 1388-2:1981 Part 2: Detection of alkalinity or determination of acidity to phenolphthalein
  - ISO 1388-3:1981 Part 3: Estimation of content of carbonyl compounds present in small amounts — Photometric method
  - ISO 1388-4:1981 Part 4: Estimation of content of carbonyl compounds present in moderate amounts — Titrimetric method
  - ISO 1388-5:1981 Part 5: Determination of aldehydes content — Visual colorimetric method
  - ISO 1388-6:1981 Part 6: Test for miscibility with water
  - ISO 1388-7:1981 Part 7: Determination of methanol content (methanol contents between 0,01 and 0,20 % (V/V)) — Photometric method
  - ISO 1388-8:1981 Part 8: Determination of methanol content (methanol contents between 0,10 and 1,50 % (V/V)) — Visual colorimetric method
  - ISO 1388-9:1981 Part 9: Determination of esters content — Titrimetric method after saponification
  - ISO 1388-10:1981 Part 10: Estimation of hydrocarbons content — Distillation method
  - ISO 1388-11:1981 Part 11: Test for detection of furfural
  - ISO 1388-12:1981 Part 12: Determination of permanganate time
- ISO 1389 Phthalic anhydride for industrial use — Methods of test
  - ISO 1389-1:1977 Part 1: General [Withdrawn without replacement]
  - ISO 1389-2:1977 Part 2: Measurement of colour of the molten material [Withdrawn without replacement]
  - ISO 1389-3:1977 Part 3: Measurement of colour stability [Withdrawn without replacement]
  - ISO 1389-4:1977 Part 4: Measurement of colour after treatment with sulphuric acid [Withdrawn without replacement]
  - ISO 1389-5:1977 Part 5: Determination of free acidity — Potentiometric method [Withdrawn without replacement]
  - ISO 1389-6:1977 Part 6: Determination of phthalic anhydride content — Titrimetric method [Withdrawn without replacement]
  - ISO 1389-7:1977 Part 7: Determination of maleic anhydride content — Polarographic method [Withdrawn without replacement]
  - ISO 1389-8:1977 Part 8: Determination of ash [Withdrawn without replacement]
  - ISO 1389-9:1977 Part 9: Determination of impurities oxidizable in the cold by potassium permanganate — Iodometric method [Withdrawn without replacement]
  - ISO 1389-10:1977 Part 10: Determination of 1,4- naphthaquinone content — Colorimetric method [Withdrawn without replacement]
  - ISO 1389-11:1977 Part 11: Determination of iron content — 2,2'- Bipyridyl photometric method [Withdrawn without replacement]
- ISO 1390 Maleic anhydride for industrial use — Methods of test
  - ISO 1390-1:1977 Part 1: General [Withdrawn without replacement]
  - ISO 1390-2:1977 Part 2: Measurement of colour of the molten material [Withdrawn without replacement]
  - ISO 1390-3:1977 Part 3: Determination of free acidity — Potentiometric method [Withdrawn without replacement]
  - ISO 1390-4:1977 Part 4: Determination of maleic anhydride content — Polarographic method [Withdrawn without replacement]
  - ISO 1390-5:1977 Part 5: Determination of ash [Withdrawn without replacement]
  - ISO 1390-6:1977 Part 6: Determination of iron content — 2,2'- Bipyridyl photometric method [Withdrawn without replacement]
- ISO 1391 Paraformaldehyde for industrial use — Methods of test
  - ISO 1391-1:1976 Part 1: General [Withdrawn without replacement]
  - ISO 1391-2:1976 Part 2: Determination of ash [Withdrawn without replacement]
  - ISO 1391-3:1976 Part 3: Determination of iron content — 2,2'- Bipyridyl photometric method [Withdrawn without replacement]
  - ISO 1391-4:1976 Part 4: Determination of water-insoluble matter [Withdrawn without replacement]
- ISO 1392:1977 Determination of crystallizing point — General method
- ISO 1393:1977 Liquid halogenated hydrocarbons for industrial use — Determination of acidity — Titrimetric method [Withdrawn without replacement]
- ISO 1394:1977 Liquid halogenated hydrocarbons for industrial use — Determination of cloud point [Withdrawn without replacement]
- ISO 1395:1977 Short pitch transmission precision bush chains and chain wheels [Withdrawn without replacement]
- ISO 1396:1975 Vulcanized and unvulcanized compounded rubber — Determination of copper content — Zinc diethyldithiocarbamate photometric method [Withdrawn: replaced with ISO 8053]
- ISO 1397:1975 Compounded rubber — Determination of manganese content — Sodium periodate photometric method [Withdrawn: replaced with ISO 7780]
- ISO/R 1398:1970 Rubber seals — Joint rings in asbestos-cement water piping [Withdrawn: replaced with ISO 4633]
- ISO 1399:1982 Rubber, vulcanized — Determination of permeability to gases — Constant volume method [Withdrawn: replaced with ISO 2782]
- ISO 1400:1975 Vulcanized rubbers of high hardness (85 to 100 IRHD) — Determination of hardness [Withdrawn: replaced with ISO 48, now ISO 48-2]
- ISO 1401:2016 Rubber hoses for agricultural spraying
- ISO 1402:2021 Rubber and plastics hoses and hose assemblies – Hydrostatic testing
- ISO 1403:2019 Rubber hoses, textile-reinforced, for general-purpose water applications — Specification
- ISO/R 1404:1970 Industrial air hose [Withdrawn: replaced with ISO 2398]
- ISO 1407:2011 Rubber — Determination of solvent extract
- ISO 1408:1995 Rubber — Determination of carbon black content — Pyrolytic and chemical degradation methods
- ISO 1409:2020 Plastics/rubber — Polymer dispersions and rubber latices (natural and synthetic) — Determination of surface tension
- ISO 1413:2016 Horology – Shock-resistant wrist watches
- ISO/TR 1417:1974 Automobiles — Anchorages for seat belts [Withdrawn without replacement]
- ISO 1419:2019 Rubber- or plastics-coated fabrics — Accelerated-ageing tests
- ISO 1420:2016 Rubber- or plastics-coated fabrics — Determination of resistance to penetration by water
- ISO 1421:2016 Rubber- or plastics-coated fabrics — Determination of tensile strength and elongation at break
- ISO/R 1428:1971 Fire-refined high-conductivity tough pitch copper refinery shapes [Withdrawn: replaced with ISO 431]
- ISO/R 1429:1971 Fire-refined tough pitch copper refinery shapes [Withdrawn: replaced with ISO 431]
- ISO/R 1430:1971 Phosphorus-deoxidized copper — Refinery shapes [Withdrawn: replaced with ISO 431]
- ISO 1431 Rubber, vulcanized or thermoplastic — Resistance to ozone cracking
  - ISO 1431-1:2022 Part 1: Static and dynamic strain testing
  - ISO 1431-2:1994 Part 2: Dynamic strain test [Withdrawn: replaced with ISO 1431-1]
  - ISO 1431-3:2017 Part 3: Reference and alternative methods for determining the ozone concentration in laboratory test chambers
- ISO 1432:2021 Rubber, vulcanized or thermoplastic — Determination of low-temperature stiffening (Gehman test)
- ISO 1433:1995 Rubber, vulcanized — Preferred gradations of properties [Withdrawn without replacement]
- ISO 1434:2016 Natural rubber in bales — Amount of bale coating — Determination
- ISO 1435:1996 Rubber compounding ingredients — Carbon black (pelletized) — Determination of fines content
- ISO 1436:2020 Rubber hoses and hose assemblies — Wire-braid-reinforced hydraulic types for oil-based or water-based fluids — Specification
- ISO 1437:2017 Rubber compounding ingredients — Carbon black — Determination of sieve residue
- ISO 1438:2017 Hydrometry – Open channel flow measurement using thin-plate weirs
- ISO/R 1439 Refractory arch bricks — Dimensions [Draft numbered ISO/R 1145]
- ISO 1440 Pyrometric reference cones for laboratory use – Specification [Draft numbered ISO/R 1146]
- ISO 1442:1997 Meat and meat products — Determination of moisture content (Reference method)
- ISO 1443:1973 Meat and meat products — Determination of total fat content
- ISO 1444:1996 Meat and meat products — Determination of free fat content
- ISO 1446:2001 Green coffee — Determination of water content — Basic reference method
- ISO 1447:1978 Green coffee — Determination of moisture content (Routine method) [Withdrawn without replacement]
- ISO 1452 Plastics piping systems for water supply and for buried and above-ground drainage and sewerage under pressure — Unplasticized poly(vinyl chloride) (PVC-U)
  - ISO 1452-1:2009 Part 1: General
  - ISO 1452-2:2009 Part 2: Pipes
  - ISO 1452-3:2009 Part 3: Fittings
  - ISO 1452-4:2009 Part 4: Valves
  - ISO 1452-5:2009 Part 5: Fitness for purpose of the system
- ISO/R 1453 Adding machines and calculating machines — Numeric section of ten-key keyboards [Draft numbered ISO/R 1092]
- ISO/R 1454 Adding machines and calculating machines — Keytop and printed or displayed symbols [Draft numbered ISO/R 1093]
- ISO/R 1455:1969 Adding machines and calculating machines — Classification [Draft numbered ISO/R 1094]
- ISO 1456:2009 Metallic and other inorganic coatings — Electrodeposited coatings of nickel, nickel plus chromium, copper plus nickel and of copper plus nickel plus chromium
- ISO 1457:1974 Metallic coatings — Electroplated coatings of copper plus nickel plus chromium on iron or steel [Withdrawn: replaced with ISO 1456]
- ISO 1458:2002 Metallic coatings — Electrodeposited coatings of nickel [Withdrawn: replaced with ISO 1456]
- ISO 1459:1973 Metallic coatings — Protection against corrosion by hot dip galvanizing — Guiding principles [Withdrawn: replaced with ISO 1461]
- ISO 1460:2020 Metallic coatings — Hot dip galvanized coatings on ferrous materials — Gravimetric determination of the mass per unit area
- ISO 1461:2022 Hot dip galvanized coatings on fabricated iron and steel articles — Specifications and test methods
- ISO 1462:1973 Metallic coatings — Coatings other than those anodic to the basis metal — Accelerated corrosion tests — Method for the evaluation of the results [Withdrawn: replaced with ISO 10289]
- ISO 1463:2021 Metallic and oxide coatings — Measurement of coating thickness — Microscopical method
- ISO 1464:2018 Aerospace — Tripod jacks — Clearance dimensions
- ISO 1465:1989 Aircraft — Liquid oxygen replenishment couplings — Mating dimensions
- ISO 1466:1973 Lever-operated manual switches for aircraft — Performance requirements
- ISO 1467:1973 General purpose push-pull single-pole circuit-breakers for aircraft — Performance requirements
- ISO/R 1468:1970 Methods of test for general purpose electrical cables with aluminium or aluminium alloy conductors for aircraft [Withdrawn without replacement]
- ISO/R 1469:1969 Finishes with the external screw thread for glass containers and gauges for inspection of screw closures [Draft numbered ISO 1115]
- ISO 1472:1977 Textile machinery and accessories — Cylindrical tubes for draw-twisters — Dimensions and permissible run-out [Withdrawn without replacement]
- ISO 1478:1999 Tapping screws thread
- ISO 1479:2011 Hexagon head tapping screws
- ISO/R 1480:1970 Hexagon head tapping screws — Inch series [Withdrawn without replacement]
- ISO 1481:2011 Slotted pan head tapping screws
- ISO 1482:2011 Slotted countersunk (flat) head tapping screws
- ISO 1483:2011 Slotted raised countersunk (oval) head tapping screws
- ISO/R 1488 Dimensions of elastometric toroidal sealing rings for pipe-fittings in aircraft (Inch series – Class 1 tolerances) [Draft numbered ISO/R 1077]
- ISO/R 1489 Dimensions of elastometric toroidal sealing rings for aircraft (Inch series – Class 1 tolerances) [Draft numbered ISO/R 1078]
- ISO/R 1490:1970 Performance requirements for heat-resisting (260 °C) electrical cables with copper conductors for aircraft [Withdrawn without replacement]
- ISO/R 1491:1970 Methods of test for heat-resisting (260 °C) electrical cables with copper conductors for aircraft [Withdrawn without replacement]
- ISO/R 1494 Steel tubes — Butt-welding bends 5D (90° and 180°) [Draft numbered ISO/R 1128]
- ISO 1496 Series 1 freight containers — Specification and testing
  - ISO 1496-1:2013 Part 1: General cargo containers for general purposes
  - ISO 1496-2:2018 Part 2: Thermal containers
  - ISO 1496-3:2019 Part 3: Tank containers for liquids, gases and pressurized dry bulk
  - ISO 1496-4:1991 Part 4: Non-pressurized containers for dry bulk
  - ISO 1496-5:2018 Part 5: Platform and platform-based containers

== ISO 1500 – ISO 1999 ==
- ISO 1501:2009 ISO miniature screw threads
- ISO 1502:1996 ISO general-purpose metric screw threads – Gauges and gauging
- ISO 1503:2008 Spatial orientation and direction of movement — Ergonomic requirements
- ISO 1505:1993 Textile machinery — Widths relating to dyeing and finishing machines — Definitions and range of nominal widths
- ISO 1506:1982 Textile machinery – Dyeing, finishing and allied machinery – Classification and nomenclature [Withdrawn without replacement]
- ISO/R 1508 Pesticides — Common names — Fourteenth series of terms [Draft numbered ISO/R 1062]
- ISO 1509:1973 General purpose push-pull three-pole circuit-breakers for aircraft — Performance requirements
- ISO/R 1511:1970 Protective helmets for road users [Withdrawn without replacement]
- ISO 1512:1991 Paints and varnishes — Sampling of products in liquid or paste form [Withdrawn: replaced with ISO 15528]
- ISO 1513:2010 Paints and varnishes — Examination and preparation of test samples
- ISO 1514:2016 Paints and varnishes — Standard panels for testing
- ISO 1515:1973 Paints and varnishes — Determination of volatile and non-volatile matter [Withdrawn: replaced with ISO 3251]
- ISO 1516:2002 Determination of flash/no flash — Closed cup equilibrium method
- ISO 1517:1973 Paints and varnishes — Surface-drying test — Ballotini method [Withdrawn: replaced with ISO 9117-3]
- ISO 1518 Paints and varnishes — Determination of scratch resistance
  - ISO 1518-1:2019 Part 1: Constant-loading method
  - ISO 1518-2:2019 Part 2: Variable-loading method
- ISO 1519:2011 Paints and varnishes — Bend test (cylindrical mandrel)
- ISO 1520:2006 Paints and varnishes — Cupping test
- ISO 1521:1973 Paints and varnishes — Determination of resistance to water — Water immersion method [Withdrawn: replaced with ISO 2812-2]
- ISO 1522:2006 Paints and varnishes — Pendulum damping test
- ISO 1523:2002 Determination of flash point — Closed cup equilibrium method
- ISO 1524:2020 Paints, varnishes and printing inks — Determination of fineness of grind
- ISO 1530:2003 Fishing nets — Description and designation of knotted netting
- ISO 1531:1973 Fishing nets – Hanging of netting – Basic terms and definitions
- ISO 1532:1973 Fishing nets – Cutting knotted netting to shape ("tapering")
- ISO/R 1534:1970 Protective helmets for motor motorists' set belts with retractors [Withdrawn without replacement]
- ISO 1535:1975 Continuous mechanical handling equipment for loose bulk materials — Troughed belt conveyors (other than portable conveyors) — Belts
- ISO 1536:1975 Continuous mechanical handling equipment for loose bulk materials — Troughed belt conveyors (other than portable conveyors) — Belt pulleys
- ISO 1537:1975 Continuous mechanical handling equipment for loose bulk materials — Troughed belt conveyors (other than portable conveyors) — Idlers
- ISO 1538:1984 Programming languages – ALGOL 60
- ISO/IEC 1539 Information technology – Programming languages – Fortran
  - ISO/IEC 1539-1:2018 Part 1: Base language
  - ISO/IEC 1539-2:2000 Part 2: Varying length character strings
  - ISO/IEC 1539-3:1999 Part 3: Conditional compilation [Withdrawn without replacement]
- ISO 1540:2006 Aerospace — Characteristics of aircraft electrical systems
- ISO/R 1542:1971 Nomenclature of terms used in the benzole industry- Part I [Withdrawn: replaced with ISO 1543, now withdrawn without replacement]
- ISO 1543:1981 Benzole industry — Vocabulary [Withdrawn without replacement]
- ISO 1546:1981 Procedure for milk recording for cows [Withdrawn without replacement]
- ISO 1547:1975 Aircraft — Precision fuse-links — General requirements
- ISO 1548:1976 Aircraft — Precision fuse-links — Type A
- ISO 1549:1976 Aircraft — Precision fuse-links — Type B
- ISO 1550:1973 Potassium hydroxide for industrial use — Determination of sodium content — Flame emission spectrophotometric method
- ISO/R 1551:1970 Potassium hydroxide for industrial use — Determination of sodium content — Gravimetric method using uranyl acetate and magnesium acetate [Withdrawn without replacement]
- ISO 1552:1976 Liquid chlorine for industrial use — Method of sampling (for determining only the volumetric chlorine content)
- ISO 1553:1976 Unalloyed copper containing not less than 99,90 % of copper — Determination of copper content — Electrolytic method [Withdrawn without replacement]
- ISO 1554:1976 Wrought and cast copper alloys — Determination of copper content — Electrolytic method
- ISO/R 1555:1971 Copper and copper alloy rolled flat products (thickness less than 2,5 mm (0.1 in)) — Tensile test [Withdrawn: replaced with ISO 6892-1]
- ISO/R 1556:1971 Copper and copper alloy tubes of circular section — Flattening Test [Withdrawn: replaced with ISO 8492]
- ISO 1559:1995 Dental materials — Alloys for dental amalgam [Withdrawn: replaced with ISO 24234]
- ISO 1560:1985 Dental mercury [Withdrawn: replaced with ISO 24234]
- ISO 1561:1995 Dental casting wax [Withdrawn: replaced with ISO 15854]
- ISO 1562:2004 Dentistry — Casting gold alloys [Withdrawn: replaced with ISO 22674]
- ISO 1563:1990 Dental alginate impression material [Withdrawn: replaced with ISO 21563]
- ISO 1564:1995 Dental aqueous impression materials based on agar [Withdrawn: replaced with ISO 21563]
- ISO 1565:1978 Dental silicate cement (hand mixed) [Withdrawn: replaced with ISO 9917]
- ISO 1566:1978 Dental zinc phosphate cement [Withdrawn: replaced with ISO 9917]
- ISO 1567:1999 Dentistry — Denture base polymers [Withdrawn: replaced with ISO 20795-1]
- ISO 1570:1975 Zinc and zinc alloys — Determination of tin content — Spectrophotometric method [Withdrawn without replacement]
- ISO/R 1571:1970 Shanks for pneumatic tools and fitting dimensions of chuck bushings — Part II
- ISO 1572:1980 Tea — Preparation of ground sample of known dry matter content
- ISO 1573:1980 Tea — Determination of loss in mass at 103 degrees C
- ISO 1574:1980 Tea — Determination of water extract [Withdrawn: replaced with ISO 9768]
- ISO 1575:1987 Tea — Determination of total ash
- ISO 1576:1988 Tea — Determination of water-soluble ash and water-insoluble ash
- ISO 1577:1987 Tea — Determination of acid-insoluble ash
- ISO 1578:1975 Tea — Determination of alkalinity of water-soluble ash
- ISO 1580:2011 Slotted pan head screws — Product grade A
- ISO 1585:2020 Road vehicles — Engine test code — Net power
- ISO 1586:1977 Textile machinery and accessories – Shuttles – Terms and designation in relation to the position of the shuttle eye
- ISO 1587:1975 Gypsum rock for the manufacture of binders — Specifications [Withdrawn without replacement]
- ISO/R 1588:1971 Binders based on calcium sulphate — Definitions, classification, and nomenclature [Withdrawn without replacement]
- ISO/R 1589 Rivet shank diameters [Draft numbered ISO 1051]
- ISO 1592:1977 Urea for industrial use — Determination of nitrogen content — Titrimetric method after distillation [Withdrawn without replacement]
- ISO 1593:1977 Urea for industrial use — Determination of alkalinity — Titrimetric method [Withdrawn without replacement]
- ISO 1594:1977 Urea for industrial use — Determination of ash
- ISO/R 1595:1970 Urea for industrial use — Determination of iron content — 2,2'- Bipyridyl photometric method
- ISO 1597:1994 Plastics — Unplasticized cellulose acetate — Determination of acetic acid yield [Withdrawn without replacement]
- ISO 1598:1990 Plastics – Cellulose acetate — Determination of insoluble particles
- ISO 1599:1990 Plastics — Cellulose acetate — Determination of viscosity loss on moulding
- ISO 1600:1990 Plastics — Cellulose acetate — Determination of light absorption on moulded specimens produced using different periods of heating
- ISO 1604:1989 Belt drives — Endless wide V-belts for industrial speed-changers and groove profiles for corresponding pulleys
- ISO 1607 Positive-displacement vacuum pumps — Measurement of performance characteristics
  - ISO 1607-1:1993 Part 1: Measurement of volume rate of flow (pumping speed) [Withdrawn: replaced with ISO 21360-2]
  - ISO 1607-2:1989 Part 2: Measurement of ultimate pressure [Withdrawn: replaced with ISO 21360-2]
- ISO 1608 Vapour vacuum pumps — Measurement of performance characteristics
  - ISO 1608-1:1993 Part 1: Measurement of volume rate of flow (pumping speed)
  - ISO 1608-2:1989 Part 2: Measurement of critical backing pressure
- ISO 1609:2020 Vacuum technology — Dimensions of non-knife edge flanges
- ISO 1614:1976 Glycerines for industrial use — Samples and test methods — General [Withdrawn without replacement]
- ISO 1615:1976 Glycerines for industrial use — Determination of alkalinity or acidity — Titrimetric method [Withdrawn without replacement]
- ISO 1616:1976 Glycerines for industrial use — Determination of sulphated ash — Gravimetric method [Withdrawn without replacement]
- ISO 1617:1976 Aluminium oxide primarily used for the production of aluminium — Determination of sodium content — Flame emission spectrophotometric method [Withdrawn without replacement]
- ISO 1618:1976 Aluminium oxide primarily used for the production of aluminium — Determination of vanadium content — N-Benzoyl-N-phenylhydroxylamine photometric method [Withdrawn without replacement]
- ISO 1619:1976 Cryolite, natural and artificial — Preparation and storage of test samples
- ISO 1620:1976 Cryolite, natural and artificial — Determination of silica content — Reduced molybdosilicate spectrophotometric method
- ISO 1622 Plastics — Polystyrene (PS) moulding and extrusion materials
  - ISO 1622-1:2012 Part 1: Designation system and basis for specifications [Withdrawn: replaced with ISO 24022-1]
  - ISO 1622-2:1995 Part 2: Preparation of test specimens and determination of properties [Withdrawn: replaced with ISO 24022-2]
- ISO 1624:2001 Plastics — Vinyl chloride homopolymer and copolymer resins — Sieve analysis in water
- ISO 1625:1998 Plastics — Polymer dispersions — Determination of non-volatile matter (residue) at specified temperatures [Withdrawn: replaced with ISO 3251]
- ISO/R 1627:1970 Plastics — Method of test to determine the change in electrical properties of polyethylene due to the migration of plasticizers [Withdrawn without replacement]
- ISO 1628 Plastics — Determination of the viscosity of polymers in dilute solution using capillary viscometers
  - ISO 1628-1:2021 Part 1: General principles
  - ISO 1628-2:2020 Part 2: Poly(vinyl chloride) resins
  - ISO 1628-3:2010 Part 3: Polyethylenes and polypropylenes
  - ISO 1628-4:1999 Part 4: Polycarbonate (PC) moulding and extrusion materials
  - ISO 1628-5:1998 Part 5: Thermoplastic polyester (TP) homopolymers and copolymers
  - ISO 1628-6:1990 Part 6: Methyl methacrylate polymers
- ISO 1629:2013 Rubber and latices – Nomenclature
- ISO 1634 Wrought copper and copper alloy plate, sheet and strip
  - ISO 1634-1:1987 Part 1: Technical conditions of delivery for plate, sheet and strip for general purposes [Withdrawn without replacement]
  - ISO 1634-2:1987 Part 2: Technical conditions of delivery for plate and sheet for boilers, pressure vessels and heat-exchangers [Withdrawn without replacement]
  - ISO 1634-3:1987 Part 3: Technical conditions of delivery for wrought copper alloy strip for springs [Withdrawn without replacement]
- ISO 1635:1974 Wrought copper and copper alloys — Round tubes for general purposes — Mechanical properties [Withdrawn without replacement]
- ISO 1637:1987 Wrought copper and copper alloy rod and bar — Technical conditions of delivery [Withdrawn without replacement]
- ISO 1638:1987 Wrought copper and copper alloy wire — Technical conditions of delivery [Withdrawn without replacement]
- ISO 1639:1974 Wrought copper alloys — Extruded sections — Mechanical properties [Withdrawn without replacement]
- ISO 1640:1974 Wrought copper alloys — Forgings — Mechanical properties [Withdrawn without replacement]
- ISO 1641 End mills and slot drills
- ISO 1641-1:2016 Part 1: Milling cutters with cylindrical shanks
- ISO 1641-2:2011 Part 2: Dimensions and designation of milling cutters with Morse taper shanks
- ISO 1641-3:2011 Part 3: Dimensions and designation of milling cutters with 7/24 taper shanks
- ISO 1642:1987 Plastics — Industrial laminated sheets based on thermosetting resins — Specification [Withdrawn without replacement]
- ISO/R 1646:1970 Rolling bearings — Double row self-aligning ball bearings — Radial internal clearance [Withdrawn: replaced with ISO 5753]
- ISO/R 1648:1971 Rolling bearings — Radial bearings with shields or seals — Outside diameter tolerances — Normal tolerance class and tolerance class 6 [Withdrawn: Replaced with ISO 492]
- ISO 1651:1974 Tube drawing mandrels
- ISO 1652:2011 Rubber latex — Determination of apparent viscosity by the Brookfield test method
- ISO 1653:1975 Vulcanized rubbers — Determination of compression set under constant deflection at low temperatures [Withdrawn: replaced with ISO 815, later ISO 815-(1-2)]
- ISO/R 1654:1971 Raw rubber and rubber latex — Determination of copper [Withdrawn: replaced with ISO 8053]
- ISO 1655:1975 Raw rubber and rubber latex — Determination of manganese content — Potassium periodate photometric method [Withdrawn: replaced with ISO 7780]
- ISO 1656:2019 Rubber, raw natural, and rubber latex, natural — Determination of nitrogen content
- ISO 1657:1986 Rubber, raw and rubber latex — Determination of iron content — 1,10-Phenanthroline photometric method
- ISO 1658:2015 Natural rubber (NR) — Evaluation procedure
- ISO/R 1659 Layout of multilingual classified vocabularies [Draft numbered ISO/R 1149]
- ISO 1660:2017 Geometrical product specifications (GPS) – Geometrical tolerancing – Profile tolerancing
- ISO/R 1661:1971 Technical drawings – Tolerances of form and position – Part IV: Practical examples of indications on drawings. [Withdrawn without replacement]
- ISO/R 1662:1971 Refrigerating plants — Safety requirements [Withdrawn: replaced with ISO 5149, later ISO 5149-(1-4)]
- ISO 1663:2007 Rigid cellular plastics – Determination of water vapour transmission properties
- ISO 1666:1996 Starch — Determination of moisture content — Oven-drying method
- ISO/TR 1672:1977 Hardware representation of ALGOL basic symbols in the ISO 7- bit coded character set for information processing interchange [Withdrawn without replacement]
- ISO 1673:1991 Onions — Guide to storage
- ISO 1675:1985 Plastics — Liquid resins — Determination of density by the pyknometer method
- ISO 1677:1977 Sealed radioactive sources — General [Withdrawn: replaced with ISO 2919]
- ISO 1679:1973 Data processing — Implementation of the ISO 7- bit coded character set on punched cards [Withdrawn: replaced with ISO 6586]
- ISO 1680:2013 Acoustics – Test code for the measurement of airborne noise emitted by rotating electrical machines
- ISO 1681:1973 Information processing – Unpunched paper cards – Specification
- ISO 1682:1973 Information processing — 80 columns punched paper cards — Dimensions and location of rectangular punched holes [Withdrawn without replacement]
- ISO 1683:2015 Acoustics – Preferred reference values for acoustical and vibratory levels
- ISO 1684:1975 Wire, bar and tube drawing dies — Specifications
- ISO/R 1685:1971 Shipbuilding details — Multi-purpose chocks of cast steel [Withdrawn without replacement]
- ISO 1686:1976 Sodium and potassium silicates for industrial use — Samples and methods of test — General
- ISO 1687:1976 Sodium and potassium silicates for industrial use — Determination of density at 20 degrees C of products in solution — Method using density hydrometer and method using pyknometer [Withdrawn without replacement]
- ISO 1688:1976 Sodium and potassium silicates for industrial use — Determination of dry matter — Gravimetric method [Withdrawn without replacement]
- ISO 1689:1976 Sodium and potassium silicates for industrial use — Calculation of the ratio : silicon dioxide/sodium oxide or silicon dioxide/potassium oxide
- ISO 1690:1976 Sodium and potassium silicates for industrial use — Determination of silica content — Gravimetric method by insolubilization
- ISO 1691:1976 Sodium and potassium silicates for industrial use — Determination of carbonates content — Gas-volumetric method
- ISO 1692:1976 Sodium and potassium silicates for industrial use — Determination of total alkalinity — Titrimetric method
- ISO 1693:1976 Cryolite, natural and artificial — Determination of fluorine content — Modified Willard-Winter method
- ISO 1694:1976 Cryolite, natural and artificial — Determination of iron content — 1,10- Phenanthroline photometric method
- ISO 1695:1977 o-Chlorotoluene for industrial use — List of methods of test [Withdrawn without replacement]
- ISO 1696:1977 p-Chlorotoluene for industrial use — List of methods of test [Withdrawn without replacement]
- ISO 1697:1977 Chlorobenzene for industrial use — List of methods of test [Withdrawn without replacement]
- ISO 1698:1977 o-Dichlorobenzene for industrial use — List of methods of test [Withdrawn without replacement]
- ISO 1699:1977 P-Dichlorobenzene for industrial use — List of methods of test [Withdrawn without replacement]
- ISO 1700:1988 Cinematography — 8 mm Type S motion-picture raw stock film — Cutting and perforating dimensions
- ISO 1701 Test conditions for milling machines with table of variable height — Testing of the accuracy
  - ISO 1701-0:1984 Part 0: General introduction [Withdrawn: replaced with ISO 1701-1 and ISO 1701-2]
  - ISO 1701-1:2004 Part 1: Machines with horizontal spindle
  - ISO 1701-2:2004 Part 2: Machines with vertical spindle
- ISO 1703:2005 Assembly tools for screws and nuts – Designation and nomenclature
- ISO 1704:2008 Ships and marine technology — Stud-link anchor chains
- ISO/R 1707:1970 Formic acid for industrial use — Determination of iron content — 2,2'- Bipyridyl photometric method [Withdrawn: replaced with ISO 731-6, now withdrawn without replacement]
- ISO 1708:1989 Acceptance conditions for general purpose parallel lathes — Testing of the accuracy
- ISO 1709:2018 Nuclear energy — Fissile materials — Principles of criticality safety in storing, handling and processing
- ISO/R 1710:1970 Fundamental principles for protection in the design and construction of installations for work on unsealed radioactive materials [Withdrawn without replacement]
- ISO 1711 Assembly tools for screws and nuts — Technical specifications
- ISO 1711-1:2019 Part 1: Hand-operated wrenches and sockets
- ISO 1711-2:2019 Part 2: Machine-operated sockets (impact)
- ISO/R 1713:1970 Restraining devices for children in motor vehicles
- ISO 1716:2018 Reaction to fire tests for products — Determination of the gross heat of combustion (calorific value)
- ISO 1717:1974 Rock drilling — Rotary drill-rods and rotary drill-bits for dry drilling — Connecting dimensions
- ISO 1718:1991 Rock drilling equipment — Drill rods with tapered connection for percussive drilling
- ISO 1719:1974 Rock drilling — Extension drill-steel equipment for percussive long-hole drilling — Rope-threaded equipments 7/8 to 1 1/4 in (22 to 32 mm) [Withdrawn: replaced with ISO 10207 and ISO 10208]
- ISO 1720:1974 Rock drilling — Extension drill-steel equipment for percussive long-hole drilling — Rope-threaded equipments 1 1/2 to 2 in (38 to 51 mm) [Withdrawn: replaced with ISO 10207 and ISO 10208]
- ISO 1721:1974 Rock drilling — Extension drill-steel equipment for percussive long-hole drilling — Reverse-buttress-threaded equipments 1 1/16 and 1 1/4 in (27 and 32 mm)
- ISO 1722:1974 Rock drilling — Extension drill-steel equipment for percussive long-hole drilling — Reverse-buttress-threaded equipments 1 1/2 to 2 1/2 in (38 to 64 mm)
- ISO 1724:2003 Road vehicles — Connectors for the electrical connection of towing and towed vehicles — 7-pole connector type 12 N (normal) for vehicles with 12 V nominal supply voltage
- ISO 1726 Road vehicles — Mechanical coupling between tractors and semi-trailers
- ISO 1726-1:2000 Part 1: Interchangeability between tractors and semi-trailers for general cargo
- ISO 1726-2:2007 Part 2: Interchangeability between low-coupling tractors and high-volume semi-trailers
- ISO 1726-3:2010 Part 3: Requirements for semi-trailer contact area to fifth wheel
- ISO/R 1727:1970 Pressures in brake lines and braking efficiency [Draft numbered ISO 1186]
- ISO 1728:2006 Road vehicles — Pneumatic braking connections between motor vehicles and towed vehicles — Interchangeability
- ISO 1729:1973 Information processing — Unpunched paper tape — Specification [Withdrawn without replacement]
- ISO 1730:1980 Dictation equipment – Basic operating requirements
- ISO/R 1731:1971 Dictation equipment – Classification
- ISO 1736:2008 Dried milk and dried milk products — Determination of fat content — Gravimetric method (Reference method) [Withdrawn: replaced with ISO 23318]
- ISO 1737:2008 Evaporated milk and sweetened condensed milk — Determination of fat content — Gravimetric method (Ref erence method) [Withdrawn: replaced with ISO 23318]
- ISO 1738:2004 Butter — Determination of salt content
- ISO 1739:2006 Butter — Determination of the refractive index of the fat (Reference method)
- ISO 1740:2004 Milkfat products and butter — Determination of fat acidity (Reference method)
- ISO 1741:1980 Dextrose — Determination of loss in mass on drying — Vacuum oven method
- ISO 1742:1980 Glucose syrups — Determination of dry matter — Vacuum oven method
- ISO 1743:1982 Glucose syrup — Determination of dry matter content — Refractive index method
- ISO 1745:1975 Information processing – Basic mode control procedures for data communication systems
- ISO 1746:1998 Rubber or plastics hoses and tubing — Bending tests [Withdrawn: replaced with ISO 10619-1]
- ISO 1747:1976 Rubber, vulcanized — Determination of adhesion to rigid plates in shear — Quadruple shear method [Withdrawn: replaced with ISO 1827]
- ISO/R 1748 Shipbuilding details – Wrought aluminium alloys for use in shipbuilding [Draft numbered ISO/R 1156]
- ISO 1749:1973 Aircraft — Elastomeric sealing rings — Packaging and identification [Withdrawn without replacement]
- ISO 1750:2023 Pesticides and other agrochemicals – Common names
- ISO 1751:2012 Ships and marine technology — Ships' side scuttles
- ISO 1753:1975 Cinematography — Recording and reproducing head gaps for six-track magnetic sound records on 35 mm motion-picture film containing no picture — Positions and width dimensions [Withdrawn: replaced with ISO 162]
- ISO 1754:2010 Photography — Cameras using 35 mm film and roll film — Dimensions of picture sizes
- ISO 1755:1987 Photography — Projector slides — Dimensions
- ISO 1756:1975 Industrial trucks — Dimensions of stillages — Connection gauge
- ISO 1757:1996 Personal photographic dosemeters [Withdrawn without replacement]
- ISO 1758:1976 Direct-reading electroscope-type pocket exposure meters [Withdrawn: replaced with ISO 11934, now withdrawn without replacement]
- ISO 1759:1976 Indirect-reading capacitor-type pocket exposure meters and accessory electrometers [Withdrawn: replaced with ISO 11934, now withdrawn without replacement]
- ISO/R 1761:1970 Acoustics — Procedure for describing aircraft noise heard on the ground using spectral analysis [Withdrawn: replaced with ISO 3891, now withdrawn without replacement]
- ISO 1762:2019 Paper, board, pulps and cellulose nanomaterials — Determination of residue (ash content) on ignition at 525 °C
- ISO 1763:2020 Textile floor coverings — Determination of number of tufts and/or loops per unit length and per unit area
- ISO 1764:1975 Textile floor coverings — Determination of mass per unit area of machine made textile floor coverings [Withdrawn: replaced with ISO 8543]
- ISO 1765:1986 Machine-made textile floor coverings — Determination of thickness
- ISO 1766:1999 Textile floor coverings — Determination of thickness of pile above the substrate
- ISO/R 1767:1971 Rubber — Determination of rebound resilience of vulcanizates [Withdrawn: replaced with ISO 4662]
- ISO 1768:1975 Glass hydrometers – Conventional value for the thermal cubic expansion coefficient (for use in the preparation of measurement tables for liquids) [Withdrawn without replacement]
- ISO 1769:1975 Laboratory glassware – Pipettes – Colour coding
- ISO 1770:1981 Solid-stem general purpose thermometers [Withdrawn without replacement]
- ISO 1771:1981 Enclosed-scale general purpose thermometers [Withdrawn without replacement]
- ISO 1772:1975 Laboratory crucibles in porcelain and silica
- ISO 1773:1997 Laboratory glassware — Narrow-necked boiling flasks
- ISO 1775:1975 Porcelain laboratory apparatus — Requirements and methods of test
- ISO 1776:1985 Glass — Resistance to attack by hydrochloric acid at 100 degrees C — Flame emission or flame atomic absorption spectrometric method
- ISO 1780:1984 Cinematography — Motion-picture camera cartridge, 8 mm Type S Model I — Aperture, camera aperture profile, film position, pressure pad and pressure pad flatness — Dimensions and specifications
- ISO 1781:1983 Cinematography — Projector usage of 8 mm Type S motion-picture film for direct front projection
- ISO 1783:1973 Magnesium alloys — Determination of zinc — Volumetric method
- ISO 1784:1976 Aluminium alloys — Determination of zinc — EDTA titrimetric method
- ISO 1785:1983 Cinematography — Printed 8 mm, Type S, image area on 16 mm motion-picture film perforated 8 mm, Type S (1-4) — Position and dimensions
- ISO/R 1786:1970 Statistics — Vocabulary and symbols — Second series [Withdrawn: replaced with ISO 3534]
- ISO 1787:1984 Cinematography — Camera usage of 8 mm Type S motion-picture film — Specifications
- ISO 1788 Specification for compostable plastics [Rejected draft]
- ISO 1789:1983 Building construction — Modular co-ordination — Storey heights and room heights for residential buildings [Withdrawn: replaced with ISO 6512, now replaced with ISO 21723]
- ISO/R 1790:1970 Building construction – Modular co-ordination – Reference lines of horizontal controlling co-ordinating dimensions [Withdrawn: replaced with ISO 2848]
- ISO 1791:1983 Building construction – Modular co-ordination – Vocabulary [Withdrawn: replaced with ISO 6707-1]
- ISO 1793:2005 Cinematography — Reels for 16 mm motion-picture projectors (up to and including 610 m capacity: 38 cm size) — Dimensions
- ISO/R 1794:1971 Cellular plastics and rubbers — Determination of linear dimensions [Withdrawn: replaced with ISO 1923]
- ISO 1795:2017 Rubber, raw natural and raw synthetic — Sampling and further preparative procedures
- ISO 1796:1982 Rubber, raw — Sample preparation [Withdrawn: replaced with ISO 1795]
- ISO 1797:2017 Dentistry — Shanks for rotary and oscillating instruments
- ISO 1798:2008 Flexible cellular polymeric materials — Determination of tensile strength and elongation at break
- ISO/R 1799:1971 Dimensions of elastomeric toroidal sealing rings for pipe-fittings in aircraft [Withdrawn without replacement]
- ISO/R 1800:1971 Dimensions of elastomeric toroidal sealing rings for aircraft [Withdrawn without replacement]
- ISO 1802:1992 Natural rubber latex concentrate — Determination of boric acid content
- ISO 1803:1997 Building construction – Tolerances – Expression of dimensional accuracy – Principles and terminology [Withdrawn: replaced with ISO 6707-1]
- ISO 1804:1972 Doors – Terminology [Withdrawn: replaced with ISO 22496]
- ISO 1805:2006 Fishing nets — Determination of breaking force and knot breaking force of netting yarns
- ISO 1806:2002 Fishing nets — Determination of mesh breaking force of netting
- ISO 1807:1975 Continuous mechanical handling equipment for loose bulk materials — Oscillating conveyors and shaking or reciprocating feeders with rectangular or trapezoidal trough
- ISO 1809:1977 Textile machinery and accessories – Types of formers for yarn packages – Nomenclature
- ISO 1810:1976 Copper alloys — Determination of nickel (low contents) — Dimethylglyoxime spectrophotometric method [Withdrawn without replacement]
- ISO 1811 Copper and copper alloys — Selection and preparation of samples for chemical analysis
  - ISO 1811-1:1988 Part 1: Sampling of cast unwrought products
  - ISO 1811-2:1988 Part 2: Sampling of wrought products and castings
- ISO 1812:1976 Copper alloys — Determination of iron content — 1,10- Phenanthroline spectrophotometric method
- ISO 1813:2014 Belt drives — V-ribbed belts, joined V-belts and V-belts including wide section belts and hexagonal belts — Electrical conductivity of antistatic belts: Characteristics and methods of test
- ISO 1815:1975 Continuous mechanical handling equipment for loose bulk materials — Vibrating feeders and conveyors with tubular trough
- ISO 1816:1975 Continuous mechanical handling equipment for loose bulk materials and unit loads — Belt conveyors — Basic characteristics of motorized driving pulleys
- ISO 1817:2022 Rubber, vulcanized or thermoplastic — Determination of the effect of liquids
- ISO 1818:1975 Vulcanized rubbers of low hardness (10 to 35 IRHD) — Determination of hardness [Withdrawn: replaced with ISO 48, now ISO 48-2]
- ISO 1819:1977 Continuous mechanical handling equipment — Safety code — General rules
- ISO 1820:1975 Continuous mechanical handling equipment for loose bulk materials — Storage equipment : Storage bins and bunkers, silos and hoppers, bin gates — Safety code [Withdrawn: replaced with ISO 8456]
- ISO 1821:1975 Continuous mechanical handling equipment for loose bulk materials — Belt feeders and conveyors — Safety code [Withdrawn: replaced with ISO 8456]
- ISO 1822:1973 Wool — Determination of fibre length using a single-fibre length-measuring machine [Withdrawn: replaced with ISO 6989]
- ISO 1823:2015 Rubber hose and hose assemblies for oil suction and discharge service — Specification
- ISO 1825:2017 Rubber hoses and hose assemblies for aircraft ground fuelling and defuelling — Specification
- ISO 1826:1981 Rubber, vulcanized — Time-interval between vulcanization and testing — Specification [Withdrawn: replaced with ISO 471, and later ISO 23529]
- ISO 1827:2022 Rubber, vulcanized or thermoplastic — Determination of shear modulus and adhesion to rigid plates — Quadruple-shear methods
- ISO 1828:2012 Health informatics – Categorial structure for terminological systems of surgical procedures
- ISO 1829:1975 Selection of tolerance zones for general purposes [Withdrawn: replaced with ISO 286-1]
- ISO 1830:2005 Paper, board and pulps — Determination of acid-soluble manganese [Withdrawn: replaced with ISO 12830]
- ISO 1831:1980 Printing specifications for optical character recognition
- ISO 1832:2017 Indexable inserts for cutting tools — Designation
- ISO 1833 Textiles — Quantitative chemical analysis
  - ISO 1833-1:2020 Part 1: General principles of testing
  - ISO 1833-2:2020 Part 2: Ternary fibre mixtures
  - ISO 1833-3:2019 Part 3: Mixtures of acetate with certain other fibres (method using acetone)
  - ISO 1833-4:2017 Part 4: Mixtures of certain protein fibres with certain other fibres (method using hypochlorite)
  - ISO 1833-5:2006 Part 5: Mixtures of viscose, cupro or modal and cotton fibres (method using sodium zincate)
  - ISO 1833-6:2018 Part 6: Mixtures of viscose, certain types of cupro, modal or lyocell with certain other fibres (method using formic acid and zinc chloride)
  - ISO 1833-7:2017 Part 7: Mixtures of polyamide with certain other fibres (method using formic acid)
  - ISO 1833-8:2006 Part 8: Part 5: Mixtures of viscose, cupro or modal and cotton fibres (method using sodium zincate)
  - ISO 1833-9:2019 Part 9: Mixtures of acetate with certain other fibres (method using benzyl alcohol)
  - ISO 1833-10:2019 Part 10: Mixtures of triacetate or polylactide with certain other fibres (method using dichloromethane)
  - ISO 1833-11:2017 Part 11: Mixtures of certain cellulose fibres with certain other fibres (method using sulfuric acid)
  - ISO 1833-12:2020 Part 12: Mixtures of acrylic, certain modacrylics, certain chlorofibres, certain elastane fibres with certain other fibres (method using dimethylformamide)
  - ISO 1833-13:2019 Part 13: Mixtures of certain chlorofibres with certain other fibres (method using carbon disulfide/acetone)
  - ISO 1833-14:2019 Part 14: Mixtures of acetate with certain other fibres (method using glacial acetic acid)
  - ISO 1833-15:2019 Part 15: Mixtures of jute with certain animal fibres (method by determining nitrogen content)
  - ISO 1833-16:2019 Part 16: Mixtures of polypropylene fibres with certain other fibres (method using xylene)
  - ISO 1833-17:2019 Part 17: Mixtures of cellulose fibres and certain fibres with chlorofibres and certain other fibres (method using concentrated sulfuric acid)
  - ISO 1833-18:2019 Part 18: Mixtures of silk with other protein fibres (method using sulfuric acid)
  - ISO 1833-19:2006 Part 19: Mixtures of cellulose fibres and asbestos (method by heating)
  - ISO 1833-20:2018 Part 20: Mixtures of elastane with certain other fibres (method using dimethylacetamide)
  - ISO 1833-21:2019 Part 21: Mixtures of chlorofibres, certain modacrylics, certain elastanes, acetates, triacetates with certain other fibres (method using cyclohexanone)
  - ISO 1833-22:2020 Part 22: Mixtures of viscose or certain types of cupro or modal or lyocell with flax fibres (method using formic acid and zinc chloride)
  - ISO 1833-24:2010 Part 24: Mixtures of polyester and certain other fibres (method using phenol and tetrachloroethane)
  - ISO 1833-25:2020 Part 25: Mixtures of polyester with certain other fibres (method using trichloroacetic acid and chloroform)
  - ISO 1833-26:2020 Part 26: Mixtures of melamine with certain other fibres (method using hot formic acid)
  - ISO 1833-27:2018 Part 27: Mixtures of cellulose fibres with certain other fibres (method using aluminium sulfate)
  - ISO 1833-28:2019 Part 28: Mixtures of chitosan with certain other fibres (method using diluted acetic acid)
  - ISO 1833-29:2020 Part 29: Mixtures of polyamide with polypropylene/polyamide bicomponent (method using sulfuric acid)
- ISO 1834:1999 Short link chain for lifting purposes — General conditions of acceptance
- ISO 1835:2018 Round steel short link chains for lifting purposes — Medium tolerance sling chains — Grade 4, stainless steel
- ISO 1836:1980 Short link chain for lifting purposes — Grade M (4), calibrated, for chain hoists and other lifting appliances [Withdrawn without replacement]
- ISO 1837:2003 Lifting hooks – Nomenclature
- ISO 1838:1993 Fresh pineapples — Storage and transport [Withdrawn without replacement]
- ISO 1839:1980 Tea — Sampling
- ISO 1840:1976 Definitions of living animals for slaughter — Porcines [Withdrawn without replacement]
- ISO 1841 Meat and meat products — Determination of chloride content
  - ISO 1841-1:1996 Part 1: Volhard method
  - ISO 1841-2:1996 Part 2: Potentiometric method
- ISO 1842:1991 Fruit and vegetable products — Determination of pH
- ISO 1843 Higher alcohols for industrial use — Methods of test (ISO/R 1843:1970 was Higher alcohols for industrial use — measurement of colour in Hazen units)
- ISO 1843-1:1977 Part 1: General [Withdrawn without replacement]
- ISO 1843-2:1977 Part 2: Determination of acidity to phenolphthalein — Titrimetric method [Withdrawn without replacement]
- ISO 1843-3:1977 Part 3: Determination of carbonyl compounds content — Potentiometric method [Withdrawn without replacement]
- ISO 1843-4:1977 Part 4: Determination of bromine number — Titrimetric method in the presence of mercury(II) chloride [Withdrawn without replacement]
- ISO 1843-5:1977 Part 5: Determination of total alcohols content — Titrimetric method [Withdrawn without replacement]
- ISO 1843-6:1977 Part 6: Determination of ash [Withdrawn without replacement]
- ISO 1843-7:1982 Part 7: Determination of distillation yield [Withdrawn without replacement]
- ISO 1843-8:1982 Part 8: Sulphuric acid colour test [Withdrawn without replacement]
- ISO/R 1844:1970 Higher alcohols for industrial use — Determination of density at 20 degrees C [Withdrawn: replaced with ISO 1843-1, now withdrawn without replacement]
- ISO/R 1845:1970 Higher alcohols for industrial use — Determination of distillation yield [Withdrawn: replaced with ISO 1843-7, now withdrawn without replacement]
- ISO/R 1846:1970 Higher alcohols for industrial use — Determination of acidity to phenolphthalein — Titrimetric method [Withdrawn: replaced with ISO 1843-2, now withdrawn without replacement]
- ISO/R 1847:1970 Higher alcohols for industrial use — Determination of carbonyl compounds content — Potentiometric method [Withdrawn: replaced with ISO 1843-3, now withdrawn without replacement]
- ISO/R 1848:1970 Higher alcohols for industrial use — Determination of bromine number — Titrimetric method in the presence of mercury(II) chloride [Withdrawn: replaced with ISO 1843-4, now withdrawn without replacement]
- ISO/R 1849:1970 Higher alcohols for industrial use — Determination of water content by the Karl Fischer method [Withdrawn: replaced with ISO 1843-1, now withdrawn without replacement]
- ISO/R 1850:1970 Higher alcohols for industrial use — Determination of total alcohols content — Titrimetric method [Withdrawn: replaced with ISO 1843-5, now withdrawn without replacement]
- ISO/R 1851:1970 Higher alcohols for industrial use — Determination of ash [Withdrawn: replaced with ISO 1843-6, now withdrawn without replacement]
- ISO/R 1852:1970 Higher alcohols for industrial use — Sulphuric acid colour test [Withdrawn: replaced with ISO 1843-8, now withdrawn without replacement]
- ISO 1853:2018 Conducting and dissipative rubbers, vulcanized or thermoplastic — Measurement of resistivity
- ISO 1854:2008 Whey cheese — Determination of fat content — Gravimetric method (Reference method) [Withdrawn: replaced with ISO 23318]
- ISO/R 1855:1975 Cellular rubbers – Determination of apparent density [Withdrawn: replaced with ISO 845]
- ISO 1856:2018 Flexible cellular polymeric materials — Determination of compression set
- ISO 1858:1977 Information processing – General purpose hubs and reels, with 76 mm (3 in) centrehole, for magnetic tape used in interchange instrumentation applications
- ISO 1859:1973 Information processing – Unrecorded magnetic tapes for interchange instrumentation applications – General dimensional requirements
- ISO 1860:1986 Information processing – Precision reels for magnetic tape used in interchange instrumentation applications
- ISO 1861:1975 Information processing – 7- track, 12,7 mm (0.5 in) wide magnetic tape for information interchange recorded at 8 rpmm (200 rpi) [Withdrawn without replacement]
- ISO 1862:1975 Information processing – 9- track, 12,7 mm (0.5 in) wide magnetic tape for information interchange recorded at 8 rpmm (200 rpi) [Withdrawn without replacement]
- ISO/IEC 1863:1990 Information processing – 9-track, 12,7 mm (0,5 in) wide magnetic tape for information interchange using NRZ1 at 32 ftpmm (800 ftpi) – 32 cpmm (800 cpi)
- ISO/IEC 1864:1992 Information technology – Unrecorded 12,7 mm (0,5 in) wide magnetic tape for information interchange – 32 ftpmm (800 ftpi), NRZ1, 126 ftpmm (3 200 ftpi) phase encoded and 356 ftpmm (9 042 ftpi), NRZ1
- ISO 1865:1977 Textile machinery and accessories — Serrated bars for mechanical warp stop motions — Designations of dimensions, and dimensions of cross-section [Withdrawn without replacement]
- ISO 1866:1975 Pelletized carbon black for use in the rubber industry delivered in bulk or in bins — Specification for maximum fines content [Withdrawn without replacement]
- ISO 1867:1975 Carbon black for use in the rubber industry — Specification for sieve residue [Withdrawn without replacement]
- ISO 1868:1982 Rubber compounding ingredients — Carbon black — Specification limits for loss on heating [Withdrawn without replacement]
- ISO 1869:1977 Methylene chloride for industrial use — List of methods of test [Withdrawn without replacement]
- ISO 1870:1977 Chloroform for industrial use — List of methods of test [Withdrawn without replacement]
- ISO 1871:1979 Food and feed products — General guidelines for the determination of nitrogen by the Kjeldahl method
- ISO 1872 Plastics — Polyethylene (PE) moulding and extrusion materials
- ISO 1872-1:1993 Part 1: Designation system and basis for specifications [Withdrawn: replaced with ISO 17855-1]
- ISO 1872-2:2007 Part 2: Preparation of test specimens and determination of properties [Withdrawn: replaced with ISO 17855-2]
- ISO 1873 Plastics — Polypropylene (PP) moulding and extrusion materials
- ISO 1873-1:1995 Part 1: Designation system and basis for specifications [Withdrawn: replaced with ISO 19069-1]
- ISO 1873-2:2007 Part 2: Preparation of test specimens and determination of properties [Withdrawn: replaced with ISO 19069-2]
- ISO 1874 Plastics — Polyamide (PA) moulding and extrusion materials
- ISO 1874-1:2010 Part 1: Designation system and basis for specifications [Withdrawn: replaced with ISO 16396-1]
- ISO 1874-2:2012 Part 2: Preparation of test specimens and determination of properties [Withdrawn: replaced with ISO 16396-2]
- ISO 1875:1982 Plastics — Plasticized cellulose acetate — Determination of matter extractable by diethyl ether
- ISO 1876 Swing doors — Dimensioning rules [Rejected draft]
- ISO 1877 Single-leaf wooden swing doors — Principal dimensions [Rejected draft]
- ISO 1878:1983 Classification of instruments and devices for measurement and evaluation of the geometrical parameters of surface finish [Withdrawn without replacement]
- ISO 1879:1981 Instruments for the measurement of surface roughness by the profile method — Vocabulary [Withdrawn without replacement]
- ISO 1880:1979 Instruments for the measurement of surface roughness by the profile method — Contact (stylus) instruments of progressive profile transformation — Profile recording instruments [Withdrawn: replaced with ISO 3274]
- ISO 1881:1973 Coke not greater than 60 mm top size — Determination of mechanical strength
- ISO/R 1882 Vocabulary of terms relating to solid mineral fuels — Part 2: Terms relating to coal sampling and analysis [Draft named ISO/R 1223-2]
- ISO/R 1883 Vocabulary of terms relating to solid mineral fuels — Part 3: Terms relating to coke [Draft named ISO/R 1223-3]
- ISO 1886:1990 Reinforcement fibres — Sampling plans applicable to received batches [Withdrawn without replacement]
- ISO 1887:2014 Textile glass — Determination of combustible-matter content
- ISO 1888:2022 Textile glass — Staple fibres or filaments — Determination of average diameter
- ISO 1889:2009 Reinforcement yarns — Determination of linear density
- ISO 1890:2009 Reinforcement yarns — Determination of twist
- ISO 1891:2009 Fasteners – Terminology
  - ISO 1891-2:2014 Part 2: Vocabulary and definitions for coatings
- ISO 1893:2007 Refractory products — Determination of refractoriness under load — Differential method with rising temperature
- ISO 1894:1979 General purpose Series 1 freight containers — Minimum internal dimensions [Withdrawn: Replaced with ISO 1496-1]
- ISO/TR 1896:1991 Products in fibre-reinforced cement — Non-combustible fibre-reinforced boards of calcium silicate or cement for insulation and fire protection [Withdrawn without replacement]
- ISO 1897:1977 Phenol, o-cresol, m-cresol, p-cresol, cresylic acid and xylenols for industrial use — Methods of test (ISO/R 1897 was Phenol, o-cresol, m-cresol, p-cresol, cresylic acid and xylenols for industrial use — Determination of water content by the Karl Fischer method)
  - ISO 1897-1:1977 Part 1: General [Withdrawn without replacement]
  - ISO 1897-2:1977 Part 2: Determination of water — Dean and Stark method [Withdrawn without replacement]
  - ISO 1897-3:1977 Part 3: Determination of neutral oils and pyridine bases [Withdrawn without replacement]
  - ISO 1897-4:1977 Part 4: Visual test for impurities insoluble in sodium hydroxide solution (Excluding cresylic acid and xylenols) [Withdrawn without replacement]
  - ISO 1897-5:1977 Part 5: Visual test for impurities insoluble in water (Phenol only) [Withdrawn without replacement]
  - ISO 1897-6:1977 Part 6: Test for absence of hydrogen sulphide (Cresylic acid and xylenols only) [Withdrawn without replacement]
  - ISO 1897-7:1977 Part 7: Measurement of colour (Cresylic acid and xylenols only) [Withdrawn without replacement]
  - ISO 1897-8:1977 Part 8: Determination of o-cresol content (Cresylic acid and xylenols only) [Withdrawn without replacement]
  - ISO 1897-9:1977 Part 9: Determination of m-cresol content (Cresylic acid only) [Withdrawn without replacement]
  - ISO 1897-10:1982 Part 10: Determination of dry residue after evaporation on a water bath (Excluding cresylic acid and xylenols) [Withdrawn without replacement]
  - ISO 1897-11:1983 Part 11: Determination of crystallizing point (Excluding cresylic acid and xylenols) [Withdrawn without replacement]
  - ISO 1897-12:1983 Part 12: Determination of distillation characteristics (Cresylic acid and xylenols only) [Withdrawn without replacement]
  - ISO 1897-13:1983 Part 13: Determination of residue on distillation (Cresylic acid and xylenols only) [Withdrawn without replacement]
  - ISO/R 1898:1971 Phenol, o-cresol, m-cresol, p-cresol, cresylic acid and xylenols for industrial use — Determination of water — Dean and Stark method [Withdrawn: Replaced with ISO 1897-2]
  - ISO/R 1899:1971 Phenol, o-cresol, m-cresol, p-cresol, cresylic acid and xylenols for industrial use — Determination of neutral oils and pyridine bases [Withdrawn: Replaced with ISO 1897-3]
  - ISO/R 1900:1971 Phenol, o-cresol, m-cresol, and p-cresol for industrial use — Determination of dry residue after evaporation on a water bath [Withdrawn: Replaced with ISO 1897-10]
  - ISO/R 1901:1971 Phenol, o-cresol, m-cresol, and p-cresol for industrial use — Determination of crystallizing point [Withdrawn: Replaced with ISO 1897-11]
  - ISO/R 1902:1971 Phenol, o-cresol, m-cresol, and p-cresol for industrial use — Visual test for impurities insoluble in sodium hydroxide solution [Withdrawn: Replaced with ISO 1897-4]
  - ISO/R 1903:1971 Phenol, m-cresol, cresylic acid and xylenols for industrial use — Determination of density at 20 degrees C [Withdrawn: Replaced with ISO 1897-1]
- ISO 1904:1972 Liquefied phenol for industrial use — Determination of phenols content — Bromination method [Withdrawn without replacement]
- ISO/R 1905:1971 Liquefied phenol for industrial use — Visual test for impurities insoluble in water [Withdrawn: Replaced with ISO 1897-5]
- ISO/R 1906:1971 Cresylic acid and xylenols for industrial use — Determination of distillation characteristics [Withdrawn: Replaced with ISO 1897-12]
- ISO/R 1907:1971 Cresylic acid and xylenols for industrial use — Determination of residue on distillation [Withdrawn: Replaced with ISO 1897-13]
- ISO/R 1908:1971 Cresylic acid and xylenols for industrial use — Test for absence of hydrogen sulphide [Withdrawn: Replaced with ISO 1897-6]
- ISO/R 1909:1971 Cresylic acid and xylenols for industrial use — Measurement of colour [Withdrawn: Replaced with ISO 1897-7]
- ISO/R 1910:1971 Cresylic acid and xylenols for industrial use — Determination of o-cresol content [Withdrawn: Replaced with ISO 1897-8]
- ISO/R 1911:1971 Cresylic acid for industrial use — Determination of crystallizing point [Withdrawn: Replaced with ISO 1897-9]
- ISO/R 1912:1971 Paper vocabulary — Sixth series of terms (Definition of optical properties) [Withdrawn: Replaced with ISO 4046]
- ISO/R 1913:1971 Formic acid for industrial use — Determination of low contents of other volatile acids — Titrimetric method after distillation [Withdrawn: replaced with ISO 731-7, now withdrawn without replacement]
- ISO 1914:1972 Boric acid for industrial use — Determination of boric acid content — Volumetric method [Withdrawn without replacement]
- ISO 1915:1972 Boric oxide for industrial use — Determination of boric oxide content — Volumetric method [Withdrawn without replacement]
- ISO 1916:1972 Disodium tetraborates for industrial use — Determination of sodium oxide and boric oxide contents and loss on ignition [Withdrawn without replacement]
- ISO 1917:1972 Hydrated sodium perborates for industrial use — Determination of sodium oxide, boric oxide and available oxygen contents — Volumetric methods [Withdrawn without replacement]
- ISO 1918:1972 Boric acid, boric oxide, disodium tetraborates and crude sodium borates for industrial use — Determination of sulphur compounds — Volumetric method [Withdrawn without replacement]
- ISO 1919:1998 Road vehicles — M14 x 1,25 spark-plugs with flat seating and their cylinder head housings [Withdrawn without replacement]
- ISO 1920 Testing of concrete
- ISO 1920-1:2004 Part 1: Sampling of fresh concrete
- ISO 1920-2:2016 Part 2: Properties of fresh concrete
- ISO 1920-3:2019 Part 3: Making and curing test specimens
- ISO 1920-4:2020 Part 4: Strength of hardened concrete
- ISO 1920-5:2018 Part 5: Density and water penetration depth
- ISO 1920-6:2019 Part 6: Sampling, preparing and testing of concrete cores
- ISO 1920-7:2004 Part 7: Non-destructive tests on hardened concrete
- ISO 1920-8:2009 Part 8: Determination of drying shrinkage of concrete for samples prepared in the field or in the laboratory
- ISO 1920-9:2009 Part 9: Determination of creep of concrete cylinders in compression
- ISO 1920-10:2010 Part 10: Determination of static modulus of elasticity in compression
- ISO 1920-11:2013 Part 11: Determination of the chloride resistance of concrete, unidirectional diffusion
- ISO 1920-12:2015 Part 12: Determination of the carbonation resistance of concrete — Accelerated carbonation method
- ISO 1920-13:2018 Part 13: Properties of fresh self compacting concrete
- ISO 1920-14:2019 Part 14: Setting time of concrete mixtures by resistance to penetration
- ISO 1922:2018 Rigid cellular plastics — Determination of shear properties
- ISO 1923:1981 Cellular plastics and rubbers — Determination of linear dimensions
- ISO 1924 Paper and board — Determination of tensile properties
  - ISO 1924-1:1992 Part 1: Constant rate of loading method [Withdrawn without replacement]
  - ISO 1924-2:2008 Part 2: Constant rate of elongation method (20 mm/min)
  - ISO 1924-3:2005 Part 3: Constant rate of elongation method (100 mm/min)
- ISO 1925:2001 Mechanical vibration — Balancing — Vocabulary [Withdrawn: replaced with ISO 21940-2]
- ISO 1926:2009 Rigid cellular plastics — Determination of tensile properties
- ISO 1927 Monolithic (unshaped) refractory products
  - ISO 1927-1:2012 Part 1: Introduction and classification
  - ISO 1927-2:2012 Part 2: Sampling for testing
  - ISO 1927-3:2012 Part 3: Characterization as received
  - ISO 1927-4:2012 Part 4: Determination of consistency of castables
  - ISO 1927-5:2012 Part 5: Preparation and treatment of test pieces
  - ISO 1927-6:2012 Part 6: Measurement of physical properties
  - ISO 1927-7:2012 Part 7: Tests on pre-formed shapes
  - ISO 1927-8:2012 Part 8: Determination of complementary properties
- ISO 1928:2020 Coal and coke — Determination of gross calorific value
- ISO 1929:1993 Abrasive belts — Dimensions, tolerances and designation
- ISO 1938 Geometrical product specifications (GPS) – Dimensional measuring equipment
  - ISO 1938-1:2015 Part 1: Plain limit gauges of linear size
  - ISO 1938-2:2017 Part 2: Reference disk gauges
- ISO/R 1939:1970 Pneumatic cylinders – cylinder bores and port sizes [Withdrawn without replacement]
- ISO 1940 Mechanical vibration — Balance quality requirements for rotors in a constant (rigid) state
  - ISO 1940-1:2003 Part 1: Specification and verification of balance tolerances [Withdrawn: replaced with ISO 21940-11]
  - ISO 1940-2:1997 Part 2: Mechanical vibration — Balance quality requirements of rigid rotors — Part 2: Balance errors [Withdrawn: replaced with ISO 21940-14]
- ISO/R 1941:1970 Flat seal for hydraulic couplings [Withdrawn without replacement]
- ISO 1942:2020 Dentistry – Vocabulary
- ISO/R 1943:1970 Coupling Threads for Hydraulic or Pneumatic Piping [Withdrawn: replaced with ISO 1179-(1-4)]
- ISO/R 1944:1970 Pipe couplings for hydraulic piping (pipe threads) [Withdrawn without replacement]
- ISO 1946:1976 Textile machinery and accessories — Condenser bobbins for woollen spinning — Dimensions [Withdrawn without replacement]
- ISO 1947:1973 System of cone tolerances for conical workpieces from C = 1:3 to 1:500 and lengths from 6 to 630 mm [Withdrawn without replacement]
- ISO 1948:1987 Photography — Front lens barrels up to 127 mm — Dimensions important to the connection of auxiliaries
- ISO 1949:1987 Aircraft — Electrical connectors — Design requirements
- ISO 1950:1974 Aircraft — Identification of servicing, maintenance, ground handling and safety/hazard points [Withdrawn without replacement]
- ISO 1951:2007 Presentation/representation of entries in dictionaries – Requirements, recommendations and information
- ISO 1952:2008 Solid mineral fuels — Determination of extractable metals in dilute hydrochloric acid
- ISO 1953:2015 Hard coal — Size analysis by sieving
- ISO 1954:2013 Plywood — Tolerances on dimensions
- ISO 1955:1982 Citrus fruits and derived products — Determination of essential oils content (Reference method)
- ISO 1956 Fruits and vegetables – Morphological and structural terminology
  - ISO 1956-1:1982 (No part title)
  - ISO 1956-2:1989 (No part title)
- ISO 1957:2000 Machine-made textile floor coverings — Selection and cutting of specimens for physical tests
- ISO 1958:1973 Textile floor coverings — Determination of mass of total pile yarn per unit area [Withdrawn: replaced with ISO 8543]
- ISO 1959:1973 Textile floor coverings — Determination of measured surface pile density and measured pile fibre volume ratio [Withdrawn: replaced with ISO 8543]
- ISO 1963:1973 Aircraft — Interchangeability dimensions of battery connectors for automatic coupling [Withdrawn without replacement]
- ISO 1964:1987 Shipbuilding – Indication of details on the general arrangement plans of ships
- ISO 1965:1973 Aluminium terminal ends for crimping to aircraft aluminium electrical cables
- ISO 1966:1973 Crimped joints for aircraft electrical cables
- ISO 1967:1974 Aircraft — Fire-resisting electrical cables — Dimensions, conductor resistance and mass
- ISO 1968:2004 Fibre ropes and cordage – Vocabulary
- ISO 1969:2004 Fibre ropes — Polyethylene — 3- and 4-strand ropes
- ISO 1970:1973 Ropes and cordage — Eight-strand plaited manila and sisal ropes [Withdrawn without replacement]
- ISO 1971:1975 Aircraft — Accessory drives and mounting pads
- ISO 1973:2021 Textile fibres — Determination of linear density — Gravimetric method and vibroscope method
- ISO 1974:2012 Paper — Determination of tearing resistance — Elmendorf method
- ISO 1975:1973 Magnesium and magnesium alloys — Determination of silicon — Spectrophotometric method with the reduced silicomolybdic complex
- ISO 1976:1975 Zinc alloys — Determination of copper content — Electrolytic method [Withdrawn without replacement]
- ISO 1977:2006 Conveyor chains, attachments and sprockets
- ISO 1980:1977 Nitric acid for industrial use — Determination of total acidity — Titrimetric method [Withdrawn without replacement]
- ISO 1981:1977 Nitric acid for industrial use — Determination of nitrous compounds — Titrimetric method [Withdrawn without replacement]
- ISO/R 1982:1971 Nitric acid for industrial use — Determination of iron content — 2,2'- Bipyridyl photometric method [Withdrawn without replacement]
- ISO 1983:1977 Nitric acid for industrial use — Determination of sulphated ash — Gravimetric method [Withdrawn without replacement]
- ISO 1984 Test conditions for manually controlled milling machines with table of fixed height – Testing of the accuracy
  - ISO 1984-1:2001 Part 1: Machines with horizontal spindle
  - ISO 1984-2:2001 Part 2: Machines with vertical spindle
- ISO 1985:2015 Machine tools — Test conditions for surface grinding machines with vertical grinding wheel spindle and reciprocating table — Testing of the accuracy
- ISO 1986 Test conditions for surface grinding machines with horizontal grinding wheel spindle and reciprocating table — Testing of the accuracy
  - ISO 1986-1:2014 Part 1: Machines with table length of up to 1 600 mm
- ISO 1988:1975 Hard coal — Sampling [Withdrawn: replaced with ISO 18283]
- ISO/IEC 1989:2014 Information technology – Programming languages, their environments and system software interfaces – Programming language COBOL
- ISO 1990 Fruits – Nomenclature
  - ISO 1990-1:1982 First list
  - ISO 1990-2:1985 Second list [Withdrawn without replacement]
- ISO 1991 Vegetables – Nomenclature
  - ISO 1991-1:1982 First list
  - ISO 1991-2:1995 Part 2: Second list [Withdrawn without replacement]
- ISO 1992 Commercial refrigerated cabinets — Methods of test
  - ISO 1992-1:1974 Part 1: Calculation of linear dimensions, areas and volumes [Withdrawn without replacement]
  - ISO 1992-2:1973 Part 2: General test conditions [Withdrawn without replacement]
  - ISO 1992-3:1973 Part 3: Temperature test [Withdrawn without replacement]
  - ISO 1992-4:1974 Part 4: Defrosting test [Withdrawn without replacement]
  - ISO 1992-5:1974 Part 5: Water vapour condensation test [Withdrawn without replacement]
  - ISO 1992-6:1974 Part 6: Electrical energy consumption test [Withdrawn without replacement]
- ISO 1993 [Draft renamed ISO 1992-2]
- ISO 1994:1976 Hard coal — Determination of oxygen content [Withdrawn without replacement]
- ISO 1995:1981 Aromatic hydrocarbons — Sampling
- ISO 1996 Acoustics – Description, measurement and assessment of environmental noise
  - ISO 1996-1:2016 Part 1: Basic quantities and assessment procedures
  - ISO 1996-2:2017 Part 2: Determination of sound pressure levels
  - ISO 1996-3:2022 Part 3: Objective method for the measurement of prominence of impulsive sounds and for adjustment of L Aeq
- ISO 1997:2018 Granulated cork and cork powder — Classification, properties and packing
- ISO 1998 Petroleum industry – Terminology
  - ISO 1998-1:1998 Part 1: Raw materials and products
  - ISO 1998-2:1998 Part 2: Properties and tests
  - ISO 1998-3:1998 Part 3: Exploration and production
  - ISO 1998-4:1998 Part 4: Refining
  - ISO 1998-5:1998 Part 5: Transport, storage, distribution
  - ISO 1998-6:2000 Part 6: Measurement
  - ISO 1998-7:1998 Part 7: Miscellaneous terms
  - ISO 1998–99:2000 Part 99: General and index
- ISO 1999:2013 Acoustics – Estimation of noise-induced hearing loss
