= List of Ecma standards =

This is a list of standards published by Ecma International, formerly the European Computer Manufacturers Association.

== ECMA-1 – ECMA-99 ==
ECMA	Name	Edition	Related Standard	Still applicable (not withdrawn)
ECMA-1	6 Bit Input/Output Character Code	1963-03 – 1st edition	—N/a	No
ECMA-2	Subset of ALGOL 60 – ECMALGOL	1965-04 – 1st edition	—N/a	No
ECMA-3	CMC7 Printed Image Specification	1966-09 – 2nd edition ????-?? – 1st edition	ISO 1004	No
ECMA-4	Flow Charts	1966-09 – 2nd edition 1964-11 – 1st edition	ISO 1028	No
ECMA-5	Data Interchange on 7 Track Magnetic Tape	1970-06 – 3rd edition ????-?? – 2nd edition 1965-04 – 1st edition	—N/a	No
ECMA-6	7-Bit Coded Character Set	1991-12 – 6th edition	ISO/IEC 646; ITU-T T.50	Yes
ECMA-7	7 Bit Code in Punched Cards	1965-04 – 1st edition	ISO 1113	No
ECMA-8	Nominal Character Dimensions of the Numeric OCR-A Font	1977-01 – 2nd edition 1965-04 – 1st edition	ISO 1973-1	No
ECMA-9	FORTRAN	1965-04 – 1st edition	ISO/IEC 1539	No
ECMA-10	Data Interchange on Punched Tape	1970-07 – 2nd edition 1965-11 – 1st edition	ISO 1113	No
ECMA-11	Alphanumeric Character Set OCR-B for Optical Recognition	1976-03 – 3rd edition	ISO 1073-2	No
ECMA-12	Data Interchange on 9-Track Magnetic Tape at 32 bits per mm (800 bpi)	1970-06 – 2nd edition 1967-11 – 1st edition	ISO/IEC 1863	No
ECMA-13	File Structure and Labelling of Magnetic Tapes for Information Interchange	1985-12 4th edition	ISO 1001	Yes
ECMA-14	Rules for the definition of 4 bit sets derived from the ECMA 7 bit coded character set	1967-11 1st edition	—N/a	No
ECMA-15	Printing specifications for Optical Character Recognition	1975-08 2nd edition	—N/a	No
ECMA-16	Basic mode control procedures for data communication systems using the ECMA 7-bit code	1973-06 2nd edition	—N/a	No
ECMA-17	Graphic Representation of Control Characters of the ECMA 7-bit Coded Character Set for Information Interchange	1968-11	—N/a	Yes
ECMA-18	Printing line position on OCR single line documents	1977-01 2nd edition	—N/a	No
ECMA-19	Coding of character sets for MICR and OCR	1969-06 1st edition	—N/a	No
ECMA-20	Implementation of the ECMA 7-bit coded character set on punched cards	1969-06 1st edition	—N/a	No
ECMA-21	Character positioning on OCR journal tape	1969-06 1st edition	—N/a	No
ECMA-22	Electrical safety requirements for data processing machines	1969-06 1st edition	—N/a	No
ECMA-23	Keyboards generating the code combinations of the characters of the ECMA 7-bit coded character set	1975-01 2nd edition	—N/a	No
ECMA-24	Code independent information transfer (an extension to the basic mode transmission control procedures)	1969-12 1st edition	—N/a	No
ECMA-25	Representation of 8-bit combinations on 12-row punched cards	1970-06 1st edition	—N/a	No
ECMA-26	Recovery procedures (an extension to the basic mode control procedures for data communication systems)	1971-04 1st edition	—N/a	No
ECMA-27	Abort and interrupt procedures (an extension of the basic mode control procedures for data communication systems)	1971-04 1st edition	—N/a	No
ECMA-28	Multiple station selection procedures (an extension of the basic mode control procedures for data communication systems)	1971-04 1st edition	—N/a	No
ECMA-29	Conversational information transfer (an extension of the basic mode control procedures for data communication systems)	1971-09 1st edition	—N/a	No
ECMA-30	OCR-B sub-sets for numeric applications	1976-03 2nd edition	—N/a	No
ECMA-31	Mechanical safety requirements for DTA processing machines	1971-09 1st edition	—N/a	No
ECMA-32	Mechanical, physical and magnetic characteristics of interchangeable 6-disk packs	1971-09 1st edition	—N/a	No
ECMA-33	Track format characteristics of interchangeable 6-disk packs	1971-09 1st edition	—N/a	No
ECMA-34	Data interchange on 3,81 mm magnetic tape cassette (63 ftpmm, phase encoded at 32 bpmm)	1976-09 3rd edition	—N/a	No
ECMA-35	Character Code Structure and Extension Techniques	1994-12 – 6th edition ????-?? – 5th edition	ISO/IEC 2022	
ECMA-36	Data interchange on 9-track magnetic tape at 63 bpmm (1600 bpi) phase-encoded	1971-12 1st edition	—N/a	No
ECMA-37	Supplementary transmission control functions (an extension of the basic mode control procedures for data communication systems)	1972-06 1st edition	—N/a	No
ECMA-38	Mechanical, physical and magnetic characteristics of interchangeable single disk cartridges (top loaded)	1973-09 1st edition	—N/a	No
ECMA-39	Track Format Characteristics of Interchangeable Single Disk Cartridges (top loaded)	1973-09 1st edition	—N/a	No
ECMA-40	High-level Data Link Control Procedures (HDLC) – Frame Structure	1980-01 3rd edition	—N/a	No
ECMA-41	Magnetic tape cassette labelling and file structure for information interchange	1973-12 1st edition	—N/a	No
ECMA-42	Alpha-numeric character set for 7x9 matrix printers	1973-12 1st edition	—N/a	No
ECMA-43	8-bit coded character set structure and rules	1991-12 3rd edition	ISO 4873	Yes
ECMA-44	Implementation of the ECMA 7-bit and 8-bit coded character sets on punched cards	1975-09 1st edition	—N/a	No
ECMA-45	Data interchange on magnetic 12-disk packs (100 Mbytes)	1975-09 1st edition	—N/a	No
ECMA-46	Data interchange on 6,30 mm magnetic tape cartridge (63 bpmm, phase encoded)	1976-03 1st edition	—N/a	No
ECMA-47	Limits and measurements methods for radio interference from EDP units	1076-03 1st edition	—N/a	No
ECMA-48	Control functions for coded character sets	1991-06 5th edition	ISO 6429	Yes
ECMA-49	HDLC – Elements of procedure	1979-08 2nd edition	—N/a	No
ECMA-50	Programming language PL/1	1976-12 1st edition	—N/a	No
ECMA-51	Implementation of the numeric OCR-A font with 9x9 matrix printers	1977-01 1st edition	—N/a	No
ECMA-52	Magnetic 12-disk packs (200 Mbytes)	1977-09 1st edition	—N/a	No
ECMA-53	Representation of source programs for program interchange – APL, COBOL, FORTRAN, Minimal BASIC and PL/1	1978-01 1st edition	—N/a	No
ECMA-54	Data interchange on 200 mm flexible disk cartridges using two-frequency recording at 13 262 ftprad on one side	1982-01 2nd edition	—N/a	No
ECMA-55	Minimal BASIC	1978-01 1st edition	—N/a	No
ECMA-56	Self-loading cartridges for 12,7 mm wide magnetic tapes	1978-09 1st edition	—N/a	No
ECMA-57	Safety requirements for data processing equipment	1981-09 2nd edition	—N/a	No
ECMA-58	Flexible disk cartridge labelling and file structure for information interchange	1981-01 2nd edition	—N/a	No
ECMA-59	Data interchange on 200 mm flexible disk cartridges using two-frequency recording at 13 262 ftprad on both sides	1979-08 1st edition	—N/a	No
ECMA-60	HDLC unbalanced class of procedure	1979-08 1st edition	ISO 6159	No
ECMA-61	HDLC balanced class of procedure	1979-08 1st edition	ISO 6256	No
ECMA-62	Data interchange on 12,7 mm 9-track magnetic tape – 32 ftpmm, NRZ1, 32 cpmm – 126 ftpmm, phase encoding, 63 cpmm – 356 ftpmm, NRZ1, 246 cpmm GCR	1985-03 2nd edition	ISO 1863	No
ECMA-63	Representation of numerical values in character strings for information interchange	1980-09 1st edition	ISO 6093	No
ECMA-64	Magnetic disk for data storage devices, 160 000 flux transitions per track, 356 mm diameter	1982-09 2nd edition	ISO 6901	No
ECMA-65	Magnetic disk for data storage devices, 107 500 flux transitions per track, 266 mm and 356 mm diameter	1980-09 1st edition	ISO 6902	No
ECMA-66	Data interchange on 130 mm flexible disk cartridges using two-frequency recording at 7 958 ftprad on one side	1980-09 1st edition	ISO 6596	No
ECMA-67	130 mm flexible disk cartridge labelling and file structure	1981-01 1st edition	ISO 7665	No
ECMA-68	Reels for 12,7 mm wide magnetic tapes (Sizes 16, 18 and 22)	1981-01 1st edition	ISO 8064	No
ECMA-69	Data interchange on 200 mm flexible disk cartridges using MFM recording at 13 262 ftprad on both sides	1981-01 1st edition	—N/a	No
ECMA-70	Data interchange on 130 mm flexible disk cartridges using MFM recording at 7 958 ftprad on 40 tracks on each side	1986-06 2nd edition	—N/a	No
ECMA-71	HDLC selected procedures	1981-01 1st edition	ISO/IEC 13239:2002	No
ECMA-72	Transport protocol	1985-03 3rd edition	—N/a	No
ECMA-73	Magnetic disk for data storage devices 95 840 flux transitions per track, 200 mm outer diameter, 63,5 mm inner diameter	1982-09 2nd edition	—N/a	No
ECMA-74	Measurement of Airborne Noise emitted by Information Technology and Telecommunications Equipment	2021-12 19th edition	ISO/IEC 7779	Yes
ECMA-75	Session protocol	1982-01 1st edition	—N/a	No
ECMA-76	Magnetic disk for data storage devices, 158 000 flux transitions per track, 210 mm outer diameter, 100 mm inner diameter	1982-09 1st edition	—N/a	No
ECMA-77	Magnetic disk for data storage devices, 83 000 flux transitions per track, 130 mm outer diameter, 40 mm inner diameter	1982-09 1st edition	—N/a	No
ECMA-78	5¼-inch floppy disk	1986-06 2nd edition	—N/a	No
ECMA-79	Data interchange on 6,30 mm magnetic tape cartridge using IMFM recording at 252 ftpmm	1985-09 2nd edition	—N/a	No
ECMA-80	Local area networks (CSMA/C Baseband) Coaxial Cable System	1984-03 ??? edition	—N/a	No
ECMA-81	Local area networks (CSMA/C Baseband) physical layer	1984-03 2nd edition	—N/a	No
ECMA-82	Local area networks (CSMA/C Baseband) link layer	1984-03 2nd edition	—N/a	No
ECMA-83	Safety Requirements for DTE-to-DCE Interface	1985-09 2nd edition	—N/a	No
ECMA-84	Data presentation protocol	1982-09 1st edition	—N/a	No
ECMA-85	Virtual file protocol	1982-09 1st edition	—N/a	No
ECMA-86	Generic data presentation – Services description and protocol definition	1983-03 1st edition	—N/a	No
ECMA-87	Generic virtual terminal – Service and protocol description	1983-03 1st edition	—N/a	No
ECMA-88	Basic class virtual terminal – Service description and protocol definition	1983-03 1st edition	—N/a	No
ECMA-89	Local area networks – Token Ring technique	1985-03 2nd edition	—N/a	No
ECMA-90	Local area networks – Token bus technique	1993-09 1st edition	—N/a	No
ECMA-91	Flexible disk cartridges – File structure and labelling for information interchange	1984-03 1st edition	—N/a	No
ECMA-92	Connectionless internetwork protocol	1984-03 1st edition	—N/a	No
ECMA-93	Distributed Application for Message Interchange (MIDA)	1987-06 2nd edition	—N/a	No
ECMA-94	8-Bit coded character sets	1986-06 2nd edition	ISO/IEC 8859	Yes
ECMA-95	Limits of interference and measurement methods	1985-03 1st edition	—N/a	No
ECMA-96	Syntax of Graphical Data for multiple-workstation interface (GDS)	1985-09 1st edition	—N/a	No
ECMA-97	Local area networks – Safety requirements	1992-12 2nd edition	—N/a	No
ECMA-98	Data Interchange on 6,30 mm magnetic tape cartridge using NRZ1 recording at 394 ftpmm – Streaming mode	1985-09 1st edition	—N/a	No
ECMA-99	5¼-inch 1.2 megabyte floppy disk	1985-09 1st edition	ISO 8630	No

== ECMA-100 – ECMA-199 ==
ECMA	Name	Edition	Related Standard	Still applicable (not withdrawn)
ECMA-100	Data interchange on 90 mm flexible disk cartridges using MFM recording at 7 958 ftprad on 80 tracks on each side - ISO type 301	1988-12 2nd edition	ISO 8860	Yes
ECMA-101	Open Document Architecture (ODA) and interchange format	1988-12 2nd edition	-	No
ECMA-102	Rate adaptation for the support of synchronous and asynchronous equipment using the V. series type interface on a PCSN	1987-06 2nd edition	-	No
ECMA-103	Physical layer at the basic access interface between data processing equipment and private switching networks	1987-12 2nd edition	-	No
ECMA-104	Physical layer at the primary rate access interface between data processing equipment and private switching networks	1985-09 1st edition	-	No
ECMA-105	Private Telecommunication Networks - signalling at the S reference point - data link layer protocol (PTN SSIG-L2)	1993-06 4th edition	-	No
ECMA-106	Private Telecommunication Networks (PTN) - Signalling protocol at the S reference point - Circuit mode basic services (SSIG-BC)	1993-12 3rd edition	-	Yes
ECMA-107	File Allocation Table (FAT) file system	1995-06 2nd edition	ISO/IEC 9293	Yes
ECMA-108	Determination of high-frequency sound power levels emitted by information technology and telecommunications equipment	2016-12 6th edition	ISO9295	Yes
ECMA-109	Declared noise emission values of information technology and telecommunications equipment	2020-12 10th edition	ISO 9296	Yes
ECMA-110	Ergonomics - Requirements for monochromatic visual display devices	1985-12 1st edition	-	No
ECMA-111	Small Computer System Interface – SCSI	1985-12 1st edition	-	No
ECMA-112	X.25 (1980) Subnetwork-dependent convergence protocol	1985-12 1st edition	-	No
ECMA-113	8-bit single-byte coded graphic character sets - Latin/Cyrillic alphabet	1985-12 3rd edition	ISO/IEC 8859-5	No
ECMA-114	8-bit single-byte coded graphic character sets - Latin/Arabic alphabet	2000-12 2nd edition	ISO 8859-6	Yes
ECMA-115	Common secondary keyboard layout for languages using a Latin alphabet	1986-06 1st edition	ISO 6937/2	No
ECMA-116	BASIC	1986-06 1st edition	-	No
ECMA-117	Domain specific part of network layer addresses	1986-06 1st edition	ISO 8348/DAD2	No
ECMA-118	8-bit single-byte coded graphic character sets - Latin/Greek alphabet	1986-12 1st edition	ISO 8859-7	No
ECMA-119	Volume and file structure of CDROM for information interchange	2019-06 4th edition	ISO 9660	Yes
ECMA-120	Data interchange on 12,7 mm 18-track magnetic tape cartridges	1993-12 3rd edition	ISO 9661	Yes
ECMA-121	8-bit single-byte coded graphic character sets - Latin/Hebrew alphabet	2000-12 2nd edition	ISO/IEC 8859-8	Yes
ECMA-122	MIDA, mailbox service description and mailbox access protocol specification	1987-06 1st edition	-	No
ECMA-123	In band parameter exchange in private pre-ISDN networks using standard ECMA-102	1990-06 2nd edition	-	No
ECMA-124	Designation of unrecorded flexible disk cartridges	1987-12 1st edition	-	No
ECMA-125	Data interchange on 90 mm flexible disk cartridges using MFM recording at 15 916 ftprad on 80 tracks on each side - ISO type 302	1987-12 1st edition	ISO/IEC 9529	Yes
ECMA-126	Ergonomics - Requirements for colour visual display devices	1st edition, December 1987	-	No
ECMA-127	Remote Procedure Call (RPC) using OSI	1990-06 2nd edition	-	No
ECMA-128	8-bit single-byte coded graphic character sets - Latin alphabet No. 5	1999-12 2nd edition	ISO 8859-9	Yes
ECMA-129	Information Technology Equipment - Safety	1994-04 2nd edition	-	No
ECMA-130	Data interchange on read-only 120 mm optical data disks ( CD-ROM "Yellow Book" format)	1996-06 2nd edition	ISO 10149	Yes
ECMA-131	Referenced data transfer	1988-07 1st edition	-	No
ECMA-132	Method for measuring printer throughput	1991-06 2nd edition	-	No
ECMA-133	Private Integrated Services Network (PISN) - Reference configuration for PISN exchanges (PINX)	1998-12 2nd edition	ISO/IEC 11579-1/ETSI ETS 300 475-1	Yes
ECMA-134	Method for the specification of basic and supplementary services of Private Telecommunication Networks	1989-04 1st edition	-	No
ECMA-135	Scenarios for interconnections between exchanges of Private Telecommunication Networks	1989-04 1st edition	-	No
ECMA-136	Ergonomics - Requirements for non-CRT Visual Display Units	1989-06 1st edition	-	No
ECMA-137	Document filing and retrieval application	1990-01 1st edition	-	No
ECMA-138	Security in open systems - Data elements and service definitions	1898-12 1st edition	-	No
ECMA-139	3,81 mm wide magnetic tape cartridge for information interchange - Helical scan recording - DDS format	1990-06 1st edition	ISO 10777	Yes
ECMA-140	Document Printing Application (DPA)	1990-06 1st edition	-	No
ECMA-141	Private Telecommunication Networks (PTN) - Inter-exchange signalling - Data link layer protocol (PTN QSIG-L2)	1993-06 2nd edition	-	No
ECMA-142	Private Integrated Services Network (PISN) - Circuit mode 64kbit/s bearer services - Service description, functional capabilities and information flows (BCSD)	2001-12 3rd edition	ISO/IEC 11574; ETSI EN 300 171	Yes
ECMA-143	Private Integrated Services Network (PISN) - Circuit mode bearer services - Inter-exchange signalling procedures and protocol (QSIG-BC)	2001-12 4th edition	ISO/IEC 11572; ETSI EN 300 172	Yes
ECMA-144	8-Bit Single-Byte Coded Character Sets - Latin Alphabet No. 6	2000-12 3rd edition	ISO/IEC 8859-10	Yes
ECNA-145	8 mm wide magnetic tape cartridge for information interchange - Helical scan recording	1990-12 1st edition	ISO 11319	Yes
ECMA-146	3,81 mm wide magnetic tape cartridge for information interchange - Helical scan recording - DATA/DAT format	1990-12 1st edition	ISO 11321	Yes
ECMA-147	Data interchange on 90 mm flexible disk cartridges using MFM recording at 31 831 ftprad on 80 tracks on each side - ISO type 303	1990-12 1st edition	ISO 10994	Yes
ECMA-148	Private Integrated Services Network (PISN) - Specification, functional model and information flows - Identification supplementary services (ISSD)	1997-06 3rd edition	ISO/IEC 14136; ETSI ETS 300 173	Yes
ECMA-149	Portable Common Tool Environment (PCTE) - Abstract specification	1997-12 4th edition	ISO/IEC 13719-1	Yes
ECMA-150	3,81 mm wide magnetic tape cartridge for information interchange - Helical scan recording - DDS-DC format using 60 m and 90 m length tapes	1992-06 2nd edition	ISO 11557	Yes
ECMA-151	Data compression for information interchange - Adaptive coding with embedded dictionary - DCLZ algorithm	1991-06 1st edition	ISO/IEC 11558	Yes
ECMA-152	Data interchange on 12,7 mm 18-track magnetic tape cartridges - Extended format	1993-12 2nd edition	ISO/IEC 11559	Yes
ECMA-153	Information interchange on 130 mm optical disk cartridges of the Write Once, Read Multiple (WORM) type, using the magneto-optical effect	1994-06 2nd edition	ISO 11560	Yes
ECMA-154	Data interchange on 90 mm optical disk cartridges, Read only and rewritable, M.O.	1994-06 2nd edition	ISO 10090	Yes
ECMA-155	Private Integrated Services Networks - Addressing	1997-06 2nd edition	ISO/IEC 11571; ETSI EN 300 189	Yes
ECMA-156	Private Telecommunication Networks (PTN) - Signalling at the S reference point - Generic keypad protocol for the support of supplementary services (SSIG-KP)	1993-06 2nd edition	ETSI ETS 300 190	Yes
ECMA-157	Private Telecommunication Networks (PTN) - Signalling protocol at the S reference point - Identification supplementary services (SSIG-ID)	1993-06 2nd edition	ETSI ETS 300 191	Yes
ECMA-158	Portable Common Tool Environment (PCTE) - C programming language binding	1997-12 4th edition	ISO 13719-2	Yes
ECMA-159	Data compression for information interchange - Binary arithmetic coding algorithm	1991-12 1st edition	ISO 12042	Yes
ECMA-160	Determination of sound power levels of computer and business equipment using sound intensity measurements; Scanning method in controlled rooms	1992-12 2nd edition	ISO 9614-2	Yes
ECMA-161	Private Telecommunication Networks (PTN) - Signalling at the S reference point - Generic feature key management protocol for the control of supplementary services (SSIG-FK)	1993-06 2nd edition	ETSI ETS 300 240	Yes
ECMA-162	Portable Common Tool Environment (PCTE) - Ada programming language binding	1994-12 4th edition	ISO 13719-3	Yes
ECMA-163	Private Integrated Services Network (PISN) - Specification, functional model and information flows - Name identification supplementary services (NISD)	1997-09 3rd edition	ISO/IEC 13864; ETSI ETS 300 237	Yes
ECMA-164	Private Integrated Services Network (PISN) - Inter-exchange signalling protocol - Name identification supplementary services (QSIG-NA)	2001-12 4th edition	ISO/IEC 13868; ETSI ETS 300 238	Yes
ECMA-165	Private Integrated Services Network (PISN) - Generic functional protocol for the support of supplementary services - Inter-exchange signalling procedures and protocol (QSIG-GF)	2001-06 4th edition	ISO/IEC 11582; ETSI ETS 300 239	Yes
ECMA-166	Information Technology Equipment - Routine Electrical Safety Testing in Production	1992-06 1st edition	-	No
ECMA-167	Volume and file structure for write-once and rewritable media using non-sequential recording for information interchange	1997-06 3rd edition	ISO 13346	Yes
ECMA-168	Volume and file structure of read-only and write-once compact disk media for information interchange. ISO 9660 Level 3	1994-12 2nd edition	ISO/IEC 13490	Yes
ECMA-169	8 mm wide magnetic tape cartridge dual azimuth format for information interchange - Helical scan recording	1992-09 1st edition	ISO 12246	Yes
ECMA-170	3,81 mm wide magnetic tape cartridge for information interchange - Helical scan recording - DDS format using 60 m and 90 m length tapes	1992-06 1st edition	ISO/IEC 12247	Yes
ECMA-171	3,81 mm wide magnetic tape cartridge for information interchange - Helical scan recording - DATA/DAT-DC format using 60 m and 90 m length tapes	1992-06 1st edition	ISO/IEC 12248	Yes
ECMA-172	Procedure for measurement of emissions of electric and magnetic fields from VDUs from 5 Hz to 400 kHz	1992-06 1st edition	-	No
ECMA-173	Private Integrated Services Network (PISN) - Specification, functional model and information flows - Call diversion supplementary services (CFSD)	2001-12 3rd edition	ISO/IEC 13872; ETSI ETS 300 256	Yes
ECMA-174	Private Integrated Services Network (PISN) - Inter-exchange signalling protocol - Call diversion supplementary services (QSIG-CF)	2001-12 3rd edition	ISO/IEC 13873; ETSI ETS 300 257	Yes
ECMA-175	Private Integrated Services Network (PISN) - Specification, functional model and information flows - Path replacement additional network feature (ANF-PRSD)	1998-12 3rd edition	ISO/IEC 13863; ETSI ETS 300 258	Yes
ECMA-176	Private Integrated Services Network (PISN) - Inter-exchange signalling protocol - Path replacement additional network feature (QSIG-PR)	2001-12 4th edition	ISO/IEC 13874; ETSI ETS 300 259	Yes
ECMA-177	Private Integrated Services Network (PISN) - Specification, functional model and information flows - Call transfer supplementary service (CTSD)	2001-12 3rd edition	ISO/IEC 13865; ETSI ETS 300 260	Yes
ECMA-178	Private Integrated Services Network (PISN) - Inter-exchange signalling protocol - Call transfer supplementary service (QSIG-CT)	2001-12 3rd edition	ISO/IEC 13869; ETSI ETS 300 261	Yes
ECMA-179	Services for Computer Supported Telecommunications Applications (CSTA) Phase I	1992-06 1st edition	-	Yes
ECMA-180	Protocol for Computer Supported Telecommunications Applications (CSTA) Phase I	1992-06 1st edition	-	No
ECMA-181	Uncertainty of measurement as applied to type approval of product	1992-06 1st edition	-	No
ECMA-182	Data interchange on 12,7 mm 48-track magnetic tape cartridges - DLT1 format	1992-06 1st edition	ISO/IEC 13421	Yes
ECMA-183	Data interchange on 130 mm optical disk cartridges - Capacity: 1 Gigabyte per cartridge	1992-06 1st edition	ISO 13481	Yes
ECMA-184	Data interchange on 130 mm optical disk cartridges - Capacity: 1,3 Gigabytes per cartridge	1992-06 1st edition	ISO 13549	Yes
ECMA-185	Private Integrated Services Network (PISN) - Specification, functional model and information flows - Call completion supplementary services (CCSD)	1997-06 2nd edition	ISO/IEC 13866; ETSI ETS 300 365	Yes
ECMA-186	Private Integrated Services Network (PISN) - Inter-exchange signalling protocol - Call completion supplementary services (QSIG-CC)	2001-12 4th edition	ISO/IEC 13870; ETSI ETS 300 366	Yes
ECMA-187	ODA-API - Application profile interface for handling compound documents	1993-06 1st edition	-	No
ECMA-188	ODA-API - Constituent level interface for handling compound documents	1993-06 1st edition	-	No
ECMA-189	Information interchange on 300 mm optical disk cartridges of the Write Once, Read Multiple (WORM) type using the SSF method	1993-06 1st edition	ISO 13614	Yes
ECMA-190	Information interchange on 300 mm optical disk cartridges of the Write Once, Read Multiple (WORM) type using the CCS method	1993-06 1st edition	ISO 13403	Yes
ECMA-191	Private Integrated Services Network (PISN) - Specification, functional model and information flows - Call offer supplementary service (COSD)	1997-06 2nd edition	ISO/IEC 14841; ETSI EN 300 361	Yes
ECMA-192	Private Integrated Services Network (PISN) - Inter-exchange signalling protocol - Call offer supplementary service (QSIG-CO)	2001-12 4th edition	ISO/IEC 14843; ETSI EN 300 362	Yes
ECMA-193	Private Integrated Services Network (PISN) - Specification, functional model and information flows - Do not disturb and do not disturb override supplementary services (DND(O)SD)	1997-06 2nd edition	ISO/IEC 14842; ETSI EN 300 363	Yes
ECMA-194	Private Integrated Services Network (PISN) - Inter-exchange signalling protocol - Do not disturb and do not disturb override supplementary services (QSIG-DND(O)SD)	2001-12 4th edition	ISO/IEC 14844; ETSI EN 300 364	Yes
ECMA-195	Data interchange on 130 mm optical disk cartridges - Capacity: 2 Gigabytes per cartridge	1995-06 2nd edition	ISO 13842	Yes
ECMA-196	Data interchange on 12,7 mm 36-track magnetic tape cartridges	1993-06 1st edition	ISO 14251	Yes
ECMA-197	Data interchange on 12,7 mm 112-track magnetic tape cartridges - DLT2 format	1993-12 1st edition	ISO 13962	Yes
ECMA-198	3,81 mm wide magnetic tape cartridge for information interchange - Helical scan recording - DDS-2 format using 120 m length tapes	1995-06 2nd edition	ISO 13923	Yes
ECMA-199	Immunity of VDUs to power frequency magnetic fields	1993-12 1st edition	-	No

== ECMA-200 – ECMA-299 ==
ECMA	Name	Edition	Related Standard	Still applicable (not withdrawn)
ECMA-200	Immunity of information technology equipment to lightning surges	1993-12 1st edition	-	No
ECMA-201	Data interchange on 90 mm optical disk cartridges - Capacity: 230 Megabytes per cartridge	1994-12 2nd edition	-	Yes
ECMA-202	Private Integrated Services Network (PISN) - Specification, functional model and information flows - Call intrusion supplementary service (CISD)	1997-06 2nd edition	-	Yes
ECMA-203	Private Integrated Services Network (PISN) - Inter-exchange signalling protocol - Call intrusion supplementary service (QSIG-CI)	2001-12 4th edition	-	Yes
ECMA-204	Private Telecommunication Networks (PTN) - Inter-exchange signalling protocol - Supplementary service interactions (QSIG-IA)	1993-12 1st edition	-	No
ECMA-205	Commercially Oriented Functionality Class for security evaluation (COFC)	1993-12 1st edition	-	Yes
ECMA-206	Association context management including security context management	1993-12 1st edition	-	Yes
ECMA-207	Data interchange on 90 mm flexible disk cartridges - 326 data tracks on each side - Capacity: 21 Mbytes - ISO type 305	1994-06 1st edition	ISO/IEC 14169	Yes
ECMA-208	System-Independent Data Format - SIDF	1994-12 1st edition	ISO/IEC 14863	Yes
ECMA-209	Data interchange on 12,7 mm 128-track magnetic tape cartridges - DLT3 format	1994-12 1st edition	ISO/IEC 14833	Yes
ECMA-210	12,65 mm wide magnetic tape cartridge for information interchange - Helical scan recording - DATA-D3-1 format	1995-12 2nd edition	ISO/IEC 14840	Yes
ECMA-211	Private Integrated Services Network (PISN) - Specification, functional model and information flows - Advice of charge supplementary services (AOCSD)	2001-12 3rd edition	ISO/IEC 15049 ETSI EN 301 254	Yes
ECMA-212	Private Integrated Services Network (PISN) - Inter-exchange signalling protocol - Advice of charge supplementary services (QSIG-AOC)	2001-12 3rd edition	ISO/IEC 15050 ETSI EN 301 264	Yes
ECMA-213	Private Integrated Services Network (PISN) - Specification, functional model and information flows - Recall supplementary service (RESD)	2001-12 3rd edition	ISO/IEC 15051 ETSI EN 301 257	Yes

- ECMA-205 – Commercially Oriented Functionality Class for Security Evaluation (COFC)
- ECMA-206 – Association Context Management including Security Context Management
- ECMA-208 – System-Independent Data Format - SIDF (same as ISO/IEC 14863)
- ECMA-209
- ECMA-219 – Authentication and Privilege Attribute Security Application with related Key Distribution Functions - Part 1, 2 and 3
- ECMA-231
- ECMA-234 – Application Programming Interface for Windows
- ECMA-235 – The Ecma GSS-API Mechanism
- ECMA-246 – Specification of AIT-1
- ECMA-258
- ECMA-259
- ECMA-262 – ECMAScript (ISO/IEC 16262) (standardised JavaScript)
- ECMA-286
- ECMA-291 – Specification of AIT-1 with MIC Format
- ECMA-292 – Specification of AIT-2 with MIC Format

== ECMA-300 – ECMA-399 ==
- ECMA-307 – Corporate Telecommunication Networks - Signalling Interworking between QSIG and H.323 - Generic Functional Protocol for the Support of Supplementary Services
- ECMA-308 – Corporate Telecommunication Networks - Signalling Interworking between QSIG and H.323 - Call Transfer Supplementary Services
- ECMA-309 – Corporate Telecommunication Networks - Signalling Interworking between QSIG and H.323 - Call Diversion Supplementary Services
- ECMA-316 – VXA
- ECMA-319 – Ultrium-1
- ECMA-320 – Super DLT
- ECMA-326 – Corporate Telecommunication Networks - Signalling Interworking between QSIG and H.323 - Call Completion Supplementary Services
- ECMA-329 – Specification of AIT-3
- ECMA-332 – Corporate Telecommunication Networks - Signalling Interworking between QSIG and H.323 - Basic Services
- ECMA-334 – C# programming language (ISO/IEC 23270)
- ECMA-335 – Common Language Infrastructure (ISO/IEC 23271)
- ECMA-355 – Corporate Telecommunication Networks - Tunnelling of QSIG over SIP
- ECMA-357 – ECMAScript for XML (E4X) (withdrawn)
- ECMA-360 – Corporate telecommunication networks - Signalling interworking between QSIG and SIP - Call diversion
- ECMA-361 – Corporate telecommunication networks - Signalling interworking between QSIG and SIP - Call transfer
- ECMA-363 – Universal 3D file format
- ECMA-365 – Universal Media Disc (UMD)
- ECMA-367 – Eiffel: Analysis, Design and Programming Language
- ECMA-368 – Ultra-wideband physical and MAC layers
- ECMA-369 – Ultra-wideband MAC-PHY interface
- ECMA-370 – TED - The Eco Declaration
- ECMA-372 – C++/CLI
- ECMA-376 – Office Open XML
- ECMA-377 – Holographic Versatile Disc 200 GB recordable cartridge
- ECMA-378 – Holographic Versatile Disc 100 GB HVD-ROM
- ECMA-379 – Test Method for the Estimation of the Archival Lifetetime of Optical Media
- ECMA-380 – Ultra Density Optical (UDO)
- ECMA-381 – Procedure for the Registration of Assigned Numbers for ECMA-368 and ECMA-369
- ECMA-388 – Open XML Paper Specification

== ECMA-400 – ECMA-499 ==
- ECMA-402 – ECMAScript Internationalization API Specification
- ECMA-404 – The JSON Data Interchange Format
- ECMA-407 – Scalable Sparse Spatial Sound System (S5) – Base S5 Coding
- ECMA-408 – Dart Programming Language Specification

== See also ==
- List of ISO standards
