= Amelia (typeface) =

- Designer: Stan Davis
- Date created: 1967

Amelia is a typeface designed by Stan Davis in 1967 and named for his newborn daughter. Its design superficially resembles MICR symbols. Amelia is used in the Moon Boot logo as well as the title artwork for the film Yellow Submarine. The Amelia typeface is also used in other shows such as Regular Show, Futurama and The Simpsons, as well as being used for a majority of merchandise based around Yellow Submarine and its tie-in Songtrack album.

The font was also used for Nickelodeon's U-Pick Live.

== See also ==
- Westminster (typeface)
