= SIDF =

SIDF can mean:

- Sender ID Framework
- Sheffield International Documentary Festival, known as Sheffield Doc/Fest
- The Saudi Industrial Development Fund (SIDF)
- Sugar Industry Diversification Foundation (SIDF)
- System Independent Data Format (ISO/IEC 14863 & ECMA-208)
