= Optical Character Recognition (Unicode block) =

- Range: U+2440..U+245F (32 code points)
- Plane: BMP
- Scripts: Common
- Symbol sets: OCR controls
- Assigned: 11 code points
- Unused: 21 reserved code points
- Source standards: ISO 2033

Unicode version history
- 1.0.0 (1991): 11 (+11)

Unicode documentation
- Code chart ∣ Web page

Optical Character Recognition is a Unicode block containing signal characters for OCR and MICR standards.

== Block ==
Optical Character Recognition^{[1]}^{[2]} Official Unicode Consortium code chart (PDF)
	0	1	2	3	4	5	6	7	8	9	A	B	C	D	E	F
U+244x	⑀	⑁	⑂	⑃	⑄	⑅	⑆	⑇	⑈	⑉	⑊					
U+245x																
Notes: 1. As of Unicode version 17.0; 2. Grey areas indicate non-assigned code points

== Subheadings ==
The Optical Character Recognition block has three informal subheadings (groupings) within its character collection: OCR-A, MICR, and OCR.

=== OCR-A ===
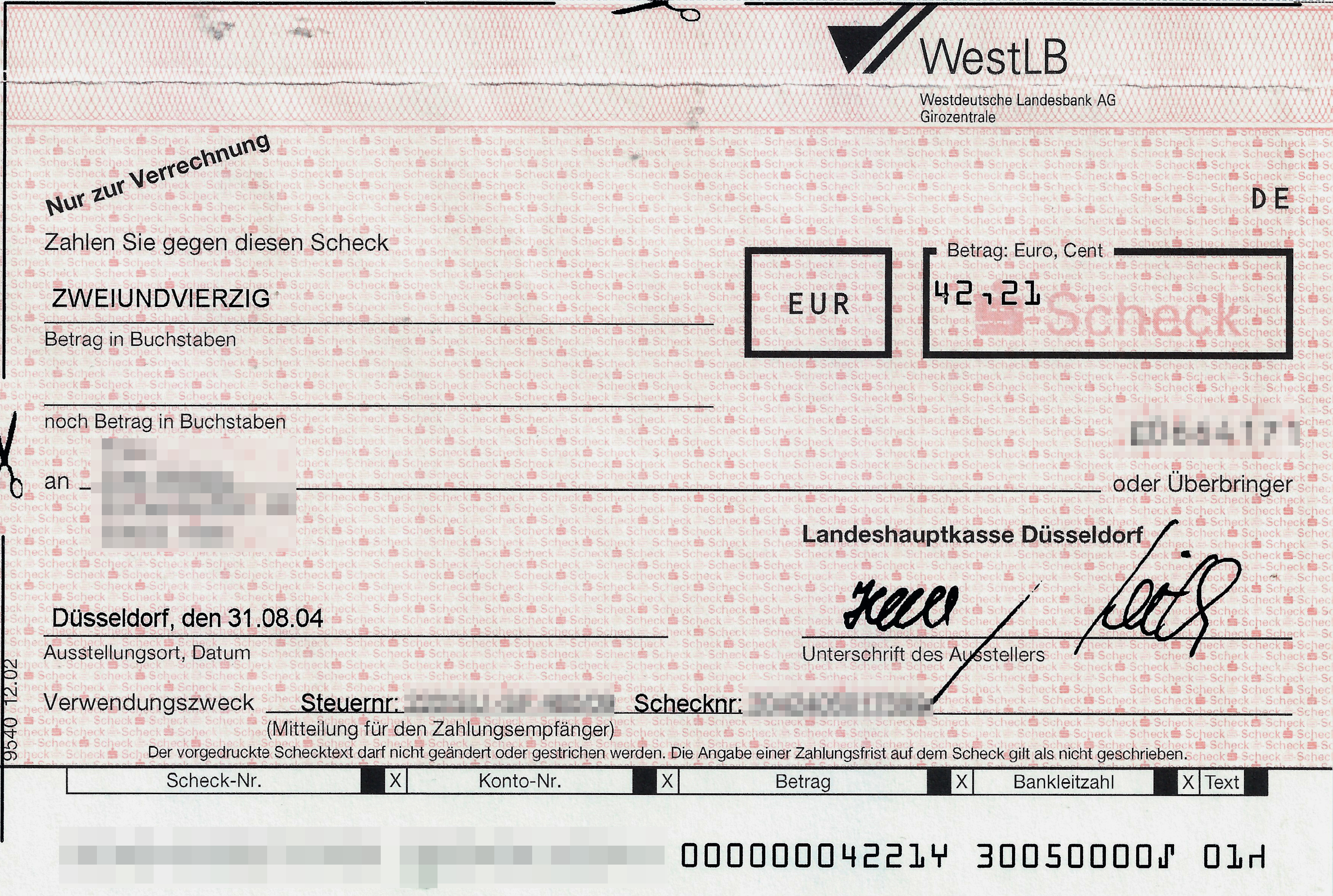
A partly redacted German cheque, showing use of ⑂, ⑀ and ⑁ in the machine-readable line

The OCR-A subheading contains six characters taken from the OCR-A font described in the ISO 1073-1:1976 standard: U+2440 ⑀ OCR HOOK, U+2441 ⑁ OCR CHAIR, U+2442 ⑂ OCR FORK, U+2443 ⑃ OCR INVERTED FORK, U+2444 ⑄ OCR BELT BUCKLE, and U+2445 ⑅ OCR BOW TIE. The OCR bow tie is given the informative alias "unique asterisk".

The hook, chair and fork, in addition to a long vertical bar, are included in the most basic "numeric" implementation level of OCR-A, which includes digits but excludes letters and conventional punctuation. By contrast, the most basic implementation level of OCR-B instead includes the digits, plus sign, less-than sign, greater-than sign, long vertical bar and seven of the capital letters; as such, there are no characters specific to OCR-B in the Optical Character Recognition block.

=== MICR ===
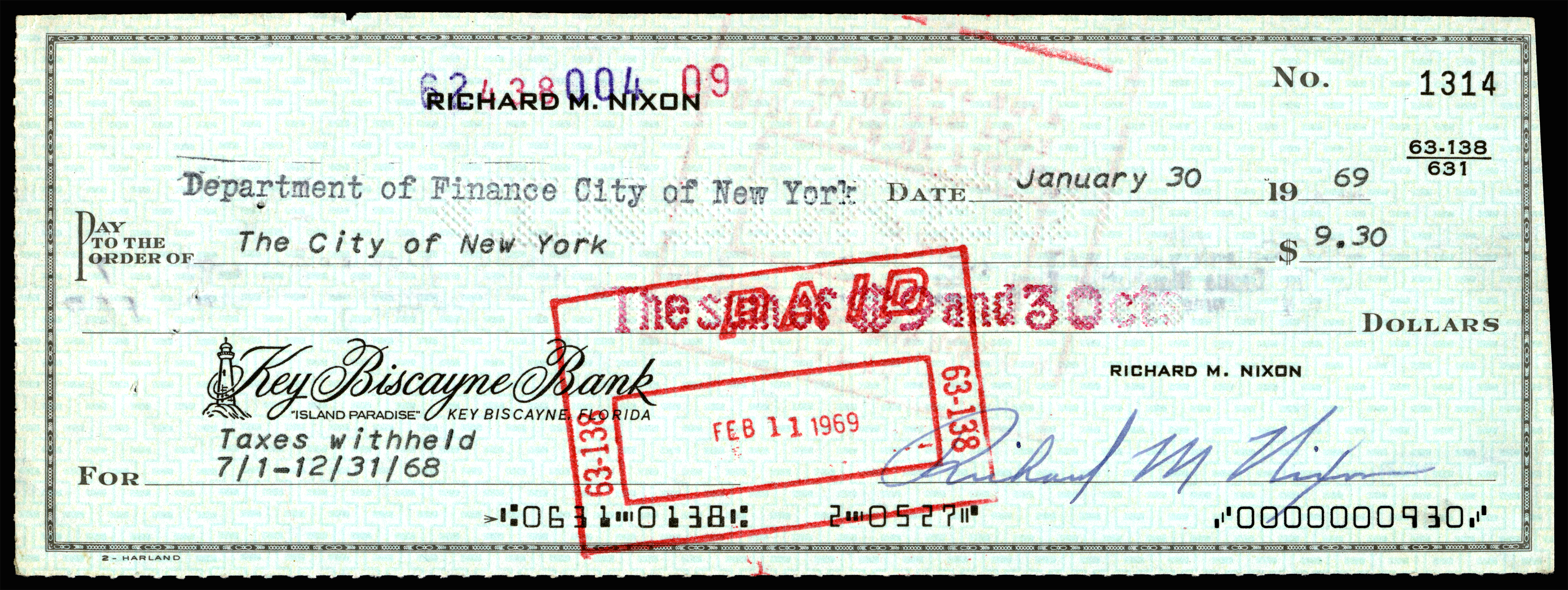
A cheque signed by Richard Nixon, showing use of ⑆, ⑇, ⑈ and ⑉ in the machine-readable line

The MICR subheading contains four punctuation characters for bank cheque identifiers, taken from the magnetic ink character recognition E-13B font (codified in the ISO 1004:1995 standard): U+2446 ⑆ OCR BRANCH BANK IDENTIFICATION, U+2447 ⑇ OCR AMOUNT OF CHECK, U+2448 ⑈ OCR DASH, and U+2449 ⑉ OCR CUSTOMER ACCOUNT NUMBER.

The latter two characters are misnamed: their names were inadvertently switched when they were named in the 1993 (first) edition of ISO/IEC 10646, a mistake which had been present since Unicode 1.0.0. Although their formal names remain unchanged due to the Unicode stability policy, they both have corrected normative aliases: U+2448 ⑈ is MICR ON US SYMBOL, and U+2449 ⑉ is MICR DASH SYMBOL (the standard notes that "the Unicode character names include several misnomers").

These symbols had previously been encoded by the ISO-IR-98 encoding defined by ISO 2033:1983, in which they were simply named SYMBOL ONE through SYMBOL FOUR. All four characters have informative aliases in the Unicode charts: "transit", "amount", "on us", and "dash" respectively.

=== OCR ===
The OCR subheading consists of a single character: U+244A ⑊ OCR DOUBLE BACKSLASH.

== History ==
The following Unicode-related documents record the purpose and process of defining specific characters in the Optical Character Recognition block:

Version	Final code points (Note: Proposed code points and characters names may differ from final code points and names)	Count	L2 ID	WG2 ID	Document
1.0.0	U+2440..244A	11			(to be determined)
1.0.0	U+2440..244A	11	L2/10-416R		Moore, Lisa (2010-11-09), "Consensus 125-C39", UTC #125 / L2 #222 Minutes, "Create two formal aliases, U+2448 MICR ON US SYMBOL and U+2449 MICR DASH SYMBOL for Unicode 6.1."
1.0.0	U+2440..244A	11		N4103	"T.3. Optical Character Recognition", Unconfirmed minutes of WG 2 meeting 58, 2012-01-03
1.0.0	U+2440..244A	11	L2/22-065		Whistler, Ken (2022-04-13), "Opt Subject: Unicode 14.0 "Optical Character Recognition" code chart [Affects U+2447]", Editorial Committee Report and Recommendations for UTC #171Meeting
