= ISO 2033 =

Font standard

The ISO 2033:1983 standard ("Coding of machine readable characters (MICR and OCR)") defines character sets for use with Optical Character Recognition or Magnetic Ink Character Recognition systems. The Japanese standard JIS X 9010:1984 ("Coding of machine readable characters (OCR and MICR)", originally designated JIS C 6229-1984) is closely related.

== Character set for OCR-A ==
The version of the encoding for the OCR-A font registered with the ISO-IR registry as ISO-IR-91 is the Japanese (JIS X 9010 / JIS C 6229) version, which differs from the encoding defined by ISO 2033 only in the addition of a Yen sign at 5C.

ISO 2033 and JIS C 6229 OCR-A set
	0	1	2	3	4	5	6	7	8	9	A	B	C	D	E	F
0x	NUL	SOH	STX	ETX	EOT	ENQ	ACK	BEL	BS	HT	LF	VT	FF	CR	SO	SI
1x	DLE	DC1	DC2	DC3	DC4	NAK	SYN	ETB	CAN	EM	SUB	ESC	FS	GS	RS	US
2x	SP		"	£ 00A3	$	%	&	'	{ 007B	} 007D	*	+	,	-	.	/
3x	0	1	2	3	4	5	6	7	8	9	:	;	⑀ 2440	=	⑁ 2441	?
4x		A	B	C	D	E	F	G	H	I	J	K	L	M	N	O
5x	P	Q	R	S	T	U	V	W	X	Y	Z		¥ 00A5	⑂ 2442		
6x																
7x													|			DEL

Redefined compared to JIS-Roman

== Character set for OCR-B ==
The version of the G0 set for the OCR-B font registered with the ISO-IR registry as ISO-IR-92 is the Japanese (JIS X 9010 / JIS C 6229) version, which differs from the encoding defined by ISO 2033 only in being based on JIS-Roman (with a dollar sign at 0x24 and a Yen sign at 0x5C) rather than on the ISO 646 IRV (with a backslash at 0x5C and, at the time, a universal currency sign (¤) at 0x24). Besides those code points, it differs from ASCII only in omitting the backtick (`) and tilde (~). An additional supplementary set registered as ISO-IR-93 assigns the pound sign (£), universal currency sign (¤) and section sign (§) to their ISO-8859-1 codepoints, and the backslash to the ISO-8859-1 codepoint for the Yen sign.

== Character set for JIS X 9008 (JIS C 6257) ==
JIS X 9010 (JIS C 6229) also defines character sets for the JIS X 9008:1981 (formerly JIS C 6257-1981) "hand-printed" OCR font. These include subsets of the JIS X 0201 Roman set (registered as ISO-IR-94 and omitting the backtick (`), lowercase letters, curly braces ({, }) and overline (‾)), and kana set (registered as ISO-IR-96 and omitting the East Asian style comma (､) and full stop (｡), the interpunct (･) and the small kana), in addition to a set (registered as ISO-IR-95) containing only the backslash, which is assigned to the same code point as in ISO-IR-93.

The JIS C 6527 font stylises the slash and backslash characters with a doubled appearance. The character names given are "Solidus" and "Reverse Solidus", matching the Unicode character names for the ASCII slash and backslash. However, the Unicode Optical Character Recognition block includes an additional code point for an "OCR Double Backslash" (⑊), although not for a double (forward) slash, although a double slash is available elsewhere, as U+2AFD ⫽ DOUBLE SOLIDUS OPERATOR.

== Character set for E-13B ==
The MICR E-13B font, showing the ISO-IR-98 character repertoire.

The ISO-IR-98 encoding defined by ISO 2033 encodes the character repertoire of the E13B font, as used with magnetic ink character recognition. Although ISO 2033 also specifies other encodings, the encoding for E-13B is the encoding referred to as ISO_2033_1983 by Perl libintl, and as ISO_2033-1983 or csISO2033 by the IANA. Other registered labels include iso-ir-98, its ISO-IR registration number, and simply e13b.

The digits are preserved in their ASCII locations. Letters and symbols unavailable in the E13B font are omitted, while specialised punctuation for bank cheques included in the E13B font is added. The same symbols are available in Unicode in the Optical Character Recognition block.

ISO 2033:1983 E-13B set
	0	1	2	3	4	5	6	7	8	9	A	B	C	D	E	F
0x	NUL	SOH	STX	ETX	EOT	ENQ	ACK	BEL	BS	HT	LF	VT	FF	CR	SO	SI
1x	DLE	DC1	DC2	DC3	DC4	NAK	SYN	ETB	CAN	EM	SUB	ESC	FS	GS	RS	US
2x	SP															
3x	0	1	2	3	4	5	6	7	8	9	⑆ 2446	⑇ 2447	⑈ 2448	⑉ 2449		
4x																
5x																
6x																
7x																DEL

Redefined compared to ASCII
