= OCR-A =

Typeface designed for early computer OCR

- Category: Sans-serif
- Classification: Geometric
- Commissioned by: American National Standards Institute
- Foundry: American Type Founders
- Date released: 1966
- Variations: OCR-A Extended
- Sample

OCR-A is a font issued in 1966 and first implemented in 1968. A special font was needed in the early days of computer optical character recognition, when there was a need for a font that could be recognized not only by the computers of that day, but also by humans. OCR-A uses simple, thick strokes to form recognizable characters. The font is monospaced (fixed-width), with the printer required to place glyphs 0.254 cm (0.10 inch) apart, and the reader required to accept any spacing between 0.2286 cm (0.09 inch) and 0.4572 cm (0.18 inch).

== Standardization ==
The OCR-A font was standardized by the American National Standards Institute (ANSI) as ANSI X3.17-1981. X3.4 has since become the INCITS and the OCR-A standard is now called ISO 1073-1:1976.

== Implementations ==
In 1968, American Type Founders produced OCR-A, one of the first optical character recognition typefaces to meet the criteria set by the U.S. Bureau of Standards. The design is simple so that it can be easily read by a machine, but it is more difficult for the human eye to read.

As metal type gave way to computer-based typesetting, Tor Lillqvist used Metafont to describe the OCR-A font. That definition was subsequently improved by Richard B. Wales. Their work is available from CTAN.

To make the free version of the font more accessible to users of Microsoft Windows, John Sauter converted the Metafont definitions to TrueType using potrace and FontForge in 2004. In 2007, Gürkan Sengün created a Debian package from this implementation. In 2008. Luc Devroye corrected the vertical positioning in John Sauter's implementation, and fixed the name of lower case z.

Independently, Matthew Skala used mftrace to convert the Metafont definitions to TrueType format in 2006. In 2011 he released a new version created by rewriting the Metafont definitions to work with METATYPE1, generating outlines directly without an intermediate tracing step. On September 27, 2012, he updated his implementation to version 0.2.

In addition to these free implementations of OCR-A, there are also implementations sold by several vendors. As a joke, Tobias Frere-Jones in 1995 created Estupido-Espezial, a redesign with swashes and a long s. It was used in a "technology"-themed section of Rolling Stone.

Maxitype designed the OCR-X typeface—based on the OCR-A typeface with OpenType features, alien/technology-themed dingbats and available in six weights (Thin, Light, Regular, Medium, Bold, Black).

Japanese typeface foundry Visual Design Laboratory (VDL) designed two typefaces based on the OCR-A typeface: one for Simplified Chinese characters named Jieyouti and one for Japanese characters named Yota G (ヨタG) , both available in five weights (Light, Regular, Medium, Semi Bold, Bold).

== Use ==
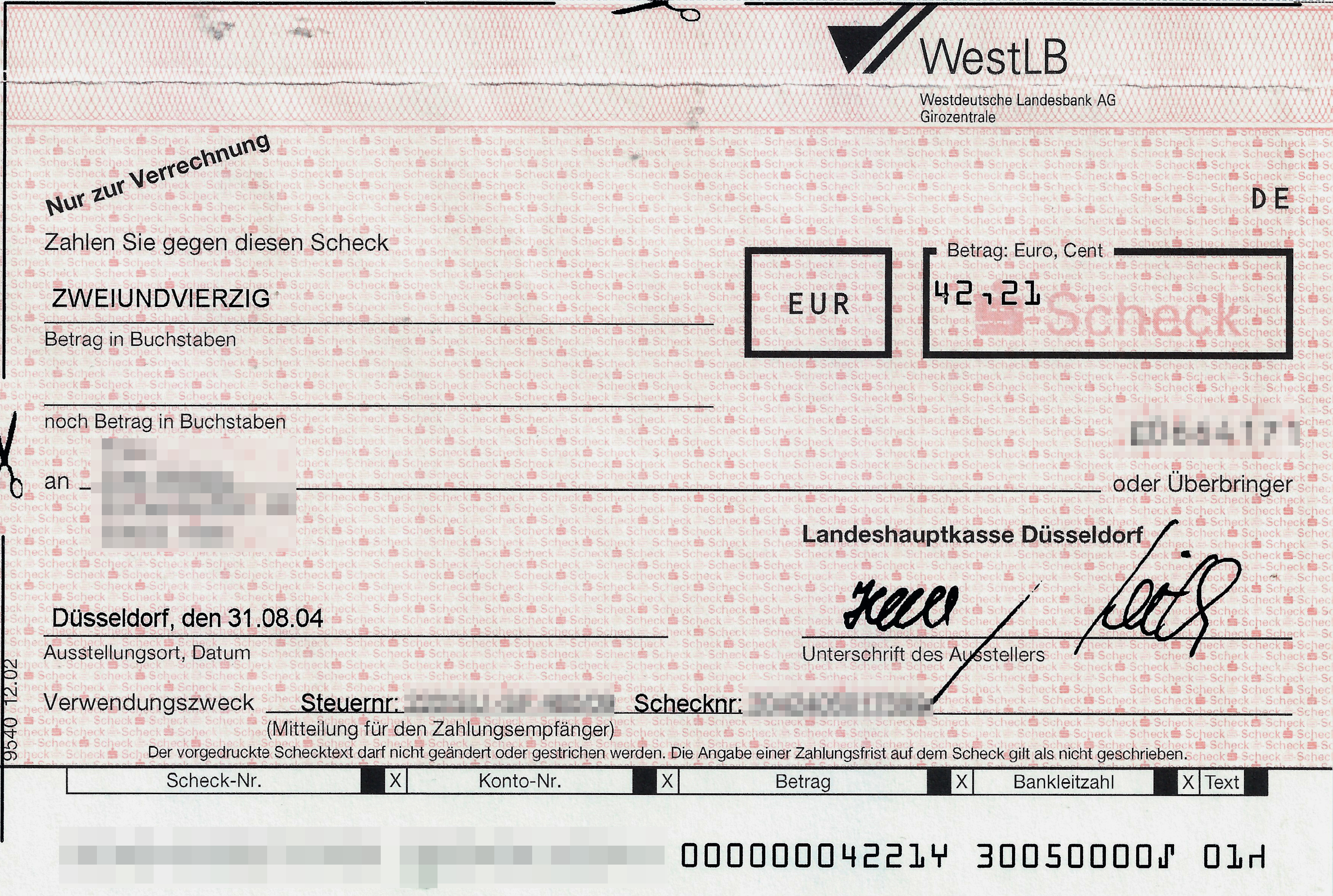
OCR-A on a German bank check. The ⑂, ⑀ and ⑁ characters are used to delimit particular fields in the machine-readable line (shown here partially pixelized out).

Although optical character recognition technology has advanced to the point where such simple fonts are no longer necessary, the OCR-A font has remained in use. Its usage remains widespread in the encoding of checks around the world. Some lock box companies still insist that the account number and amount owed on a bill return form be printed in OCR-A. Also, because of its unusual look, it is sometimes used in advertising and display graphics.

Notably, it is used for the subtitles in films and television series such as Blacklist and for the main titles in The Pretender. Additionally, OCR-A is used in the titles and subtitles for the films 13 Hours: The Secret Soldiers of Benghazi and Hoppers (film). It was also used for the logo, branding, and marketing material of the children's toy line Hexbug. It was also noticeably used in The Matrix and its respective sequels as its end credits font as well as appearing in Agent Smith’s binder during the interrogation scene in the 1999 film.

== Code points ==
A font is a set of character shapes, or glyphs. For a computer to use a font, each glyph must be assigned a code point in a character set. When OCR-A was being standardized the usual character coding was the American Standard Code for Information Interchange or ASCII. Not all of the glyphs of OCR-A fit into ASCII, and for five of the characters there were alternate glyphs, which might have suggested the need for a second font. However, for convenience and efficiency all of the glyphs were expected to be accessible in a single font using ASCII coding, with the additional characters placed at coding points that would otherwise have been unused.

The modern descendant of ASCII is Unicode, also known as ISO 10646. Unicode contains ASCII and has special provisions for OCR characters, so some implementations of OCR-A have looked to Unicode for guidance on character code assignments.

=== Pre-Unicode standard representation ===
The ISO standard ISO 2033:1983, and the corresponding Japanese Industrial Standard JIS X 9010:1984 (originally JIS C 6229–1984), define character encodings for OCR-A, OCR-B and E-13B. For OCR-A, they define a modified 7-bit ASCII set (also known by its ISO-IR number ISO-IR-91) including only uppercase letters, digits, a subset of the punctuation and symbols, and some additional symbols. Codes which are redefined relative to ASCII, as opposed to simply omitted, are listed below:

Character	Image	Location	In ASCII	Comments
£	Pound Sign	0x23	#	Matches BS 4730, the United Kingdom variant of ISO 646.
{	Left Curly Bracket	0x28	(	Character name is still "LEFT PARENTHESIS", despite showing a brace. Usual left brace ASCII code 0x7B is omitted.
}	Right Curly Bracket	0x29	)	Character name is still "RIGHT PARENTHESIS", despite showing a brace. Usual right brace ASCII code 0x7D is omitted.
⑀	OCR Hook	0x3C	<	
⑁	OCR Chair	0x3E	>	
¥	Yen Sign	0x5C	\	Matches JIS X 0201. Included in JIS X 9010, but omitted by ISO 2033.
⑂	OCR Fork	0x5D	]	

Additionally, the long vertical mark is encoded at 0x7C, corresponding to the ASCII vertical bar (|).

=== Dedicated OCR-A characters in Unicode ===
The following characters have been defined for control purposes and are now in the "Optical Character Recognition" Unicode range 2440–245F:

Dedicated OCR-A code points based on ASCII and Unicode
Name	Image	Text	Unicode
OCR Hook	OCR Hook	⑀	U+2440
OCR Chair	OCR Chair	⑁	U+2441
OCR Fork	OCR Fork	⑂	U+2442
OCR Inverted fork	⑃	⑃	U+2443
OCR Belt buckle	⑄	⑄	U+2444
OCR Bow tie	⑅	⑅	U+2445

=== Space, digits, and unaccented letters ===
OCR-A digits

OCR-A unaccented capital letters

OCR-A unaccented small letters

All implementations of OCR-A use U+0020 for space, U+0030 through U+0039 for the decimal digits, U+0041 through U+005A for the unaccented upper case letters, and U+0061 through U+007A for the unaccented lower case letters.

=== Regular characters ===
In addition to the digits and unaccented letters, many of the characters of OCR-A have obvious code points in ASCII. Of those that do not, most, including all of OCR-A's accented letters, have obvious code points in Unicode.

Additional OCR-A code points based on ASCII and Unicode
Name	Glyph	Unicode
Exclamation Mark	Exclamation Mark	U+0021
Quotation Mark	Quotation Mark	U+0022
Number Sign	Number Sign	U+0023
Dollar Sign	Dollar Sign	U+0024
Percent Sign	Percent Sign	U+0025
Ampersand	Ampersand	U+0026
Apostrophe	Apostrophe	U+0027
Left Parenthesis	Left Parenthesis	U+0028
Right Parenthesis	Right Parenthesis	U+0029
Asterisk	Asterisk	U+002A
Plus Sign	Plus Sign	U+002B
Comma	Comma	U+002C
Hyphen-Minus	Hyphen-Minus	U+002D
Full Stop (Period)	Full Stop (Period)	U+002E
Solidus (Slash)	Solidus (Slash)	U+002F
Colon	Colon	U+003A
Semicolon	Semicolon	U+003B
Less-Than Sign	Less-Than Sign	U+003C
Equals Sign	Equals Sign	U+003D
Greater-Than Sign	Greater-Than Sign	U+003E
Question Mark	Question Mark	U+003F
Commercial At	Commercial At	U+0040
Left Square Bracket	Left Square Bracket	U+005B
Reverse Solidus (Backslash)	Reverse Solidus	U+005C
Right Square Bracket	Right Square Bracket	U+005D
Circumflex Accent	Circumflex Accent	U+005E
Left Curly Bracket	Left Curly Bracket	U+007B
Right Curly Bracket	Right Curly Bracket	U+007D
Pound Sign (Sterling)	Pound Sign	U+00A3
Yen Sign	Yen Sign	U+00A5
Latin Capital Letter A with Dieresis	Latin Capital Letter A with Dieresis	U+00C4
Latin Capital Letter A with Ring Above	Latin Capital Letter A with Ring Above	U+00C5
Latin Capital Letter AE	Latin Capital Letter AE	U+00C6
Latin Capital Letter N with Tilde	Latin Capital Letter N with Tilde	U+00D1
Latin Capital Letter O with Dieresis	Latin Capital Letter O with Dieresis	U+00D6
Latin Capital Letter O with Stroke	Latin Capital Letter O with Stroke	U+00D8
Latin Capital Letter U with Dieresis	Latin Capital Letter U with Dieresis	U+00DC

=== Remaining characters ===
Linotype coded the remaining characters of OCR-A as follows:

Additional OCR-A Characters
Name	Glyph	Unicode	Unicode Name
Long Vertical Mark	Long Vertical Mark	U+007C	Vertical Line

=== Additional characters ===
The fonts that descend from the work of Tor Lillqvist and Richard B. Wales define four characters not in OCR-A to fill out the ASCII character set. These shapes use the same style as the OCR-A character shapes. They are:

Additional ASCII characters
Name	Glyph	Unicode
Low Line	Low Line	U+005F
Grave Accent	Grave Accent	U+0060
Vertical Line	Vertical Line	U+007C
Tilde	Tilde	U+007E

Linotype also defines additional characters.

=== Exceptions ===
Some implementations do not use the above code point assignments for some characters.

==== PrecisionID ====
The PrecisionID implementation of OCR-A has the following non-standard code points:

- OCR Hook at U+007E
- OCR Chair at U+00C1
- OCR Fork at U+00C2
- Euro Sign at U+0080

==== Barcodesoft ====
The Barcodesoft implementation of OCR-A has the following non-standard code points:

- OCR Hook at U+0060
- OCR Chair at U+007E
- OCR Fork at U+005F
- Long Vertical Mark at U+007C (agrees with Linotype)
- Character Erase at U+0008

==== Morovia ====
The Morovia implementation of OCR-A has the following non-standard code points:

- OCR Hook at U+007E (agrees with PrecisionID)
- OCR Chair at U+00F0
- OCR Fork at U+005F (agrees with Barcodesoft)
- Long Vertical Mark at U+007C (agrees with Linotype)

==== IDAutomation ====
The IDAutomation implementation of OCR-A has the following non-standard code points:

- OCR Hook at U+007E (agrees with PrecisionID)
- OCR Chair at U+00C1 (agrees with PrecisionID)
- OCR Fork at U+00C2 (agrees with PrecisionID)
- OCR Belt Buckle at U+00C3

== Sellers of font standards ==
- Hardcopy of ISO 1073-1:1976, distributed through ANSI, from Amazon.com
- ISO 1073-1 is also available from Techstreet, who distributes standards for ANSI and ISO

== See also ==
- Magnetic ink character recognition
- Optical character recognition
- Westminster (typeface), a typeface designed to resemble the visual appearance of MICR.
- OCR-B
