= ISO/IEC 9529 =

ISO standard

ISO/IEC 9529 (Information processing systems — Data interchange on 90 mm (3,5 in) flexible disk cartridges using modified frequency modulation recording at 15 916 ftprad, on 80 tracks on each side) is a standard published by the International Organization for Standardization which defines the data format used on 3.5 inch floppy disks. It is also known as ECMA-125.

The standard consists of two parts:

- ISO/IEC 9529-1:1989: Part 1: Dimensional, physical and magnetic characteristics
- ISO/IEC 9529-2:1989: Part 2: Track format
