= System Independent Data Format =

System-Independent Data Format
- Initial release: 1993; 32 years ago
- Type of format: Tape data storage, optical data storage, tape backup, archive format
- Standard: ISO/IEC 14863, ECMA-208

The System Independent Data Format (SIDF) is a file system specification for removable media that was designed to achieve storage interoperability and to allow data interchange among software and hardware platforms. The data format was originally developed in 1990 by Tom Bogart while at Novell. In 1992, the System Independent Data Format (SIDF) committee, an industry consortium, was formed by Gary Mazzaferro while at Tallgrass Technologies to enhance the format. The SIDF committee included most data backup and archival software vendors at the time. In 1993, the specification was submitted to ECMA and adopted as an international standard by ECMA in December, 1994.

== See also ==
- List of archive formats
- Comparison of archive formats
