= OCR-B =

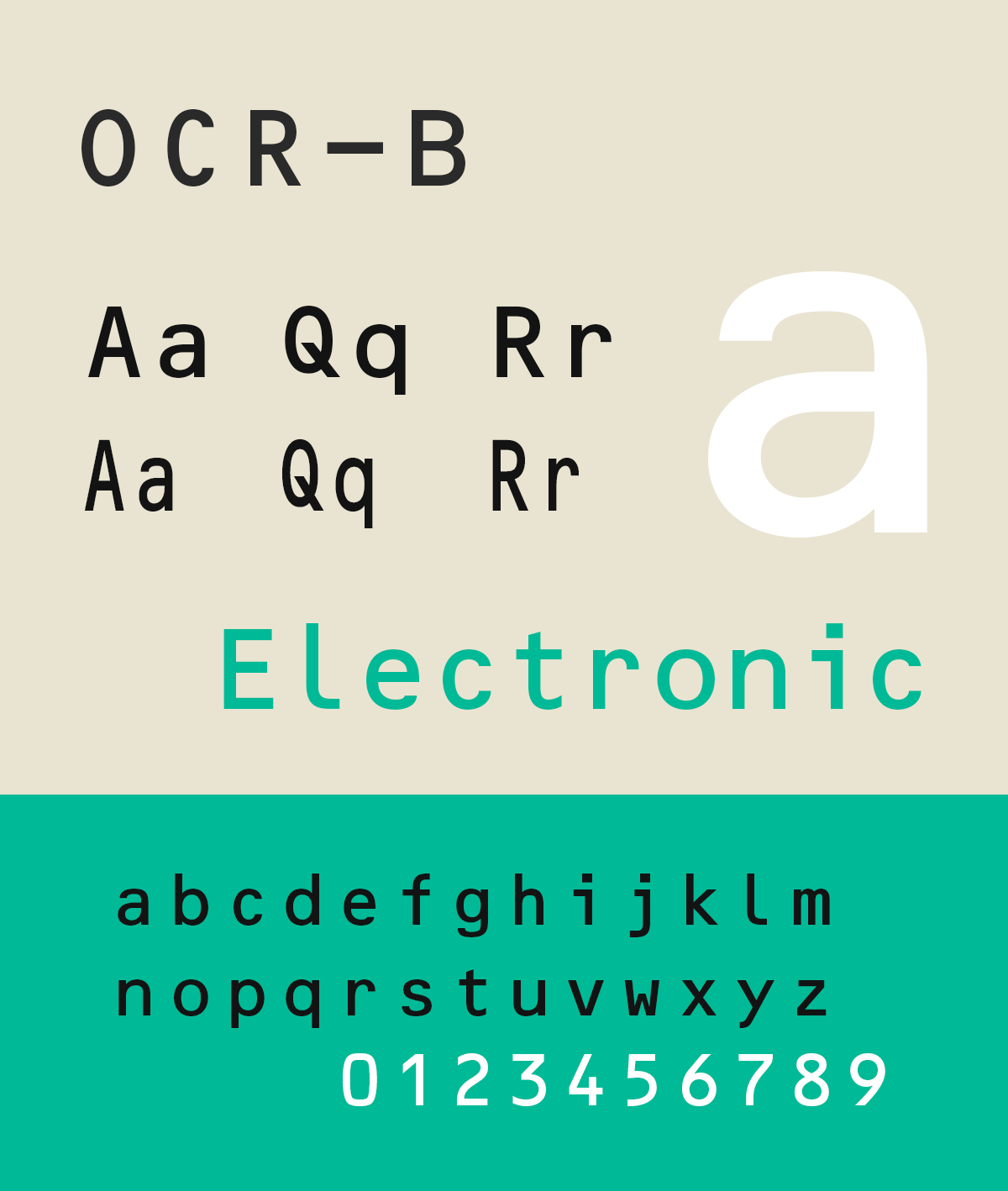
- Category: Sans-serif
- Classification: Neo-grotesque
- Designer: Adrian Frutiger
- Date created: 1968
- Re-issuing foundries: Adobe Inc., Mergenthaler Linotype
- Design based on: OCR-A
- Variations: F2F OCRBczyk

OCR-B is a monospace font developed in 1968 by Adrian Frutiger for Monotype by following the European Computer Manufacturer's Association standard. Its function was to facilitate the optical character recognition operations by specific electronic devices, originally for financial and bank-oriented uses. It was accepted as the world standard in 1973. It follows the ISO 1073-2:1976 (E) standard, refined in 1979 ("letterpress" design, size I). It includes all ASCII symbols as well as other symbols needed in the bank environment. It is widely used for the human-readable digits in UPC/EAN barcodes. It is also used for machine-readable passports. It shares that purpose with OCR-A, but it is easier for the human eye and brain to read and it has a less technical look than OCR-A.

== History ==
In June 1961, the European Computer Manufacturers Association (ECMA) started standardization activities related to Optical Character Recognition (OCR). After evaluating existing OCR designs, it was decided to develop two new fonts: A stylized design with just digits, called “Class A”; and a more conventional type design with broader character coverage, called “Class B”. In February 1965, ECMA proposed a design for the “Class B” font to ISO, who adopted it as international standard ISO 1073-2 in October 1965. The first revision contained three font sizes: I, II and III. The specification included a Letterpress design, intended for high-quality printing equipment; and a rounded-edge Constant Strokewidth design for impact printers with reduced typographic quality.

In September 1969, ECMA started work to revise its published standard. To make OCR-B more widely accepted, the shapes of some characters were slightly modified. The new revision removed font size II, which had been rarely used in practice; it deleted five character shapes; and it added a new font size IV. ECMA published the second edition of OCR-B in October 1971.

In March 1976, ECMA published a third revision of its ECMA-11 specification. It added the symbols § and ¥ to OCR-B; two types of erasure marks (█) for blackening out mis-printed characters were added; and the length of the Vertical bar was changed to match ISO 1073-2.

In 1993, Turkey proposed extending ISO 1073-2 to include the Turkish letters Ğğ, İı, and Şş. The request was generalized to extend OCR-B with a number of Latin and Greek letters used in European languages. A revision of the ISO 1073-2:1976 standard was therefore started, producing three successive draft documents. The final draft would have extended OCR-B with 40 Latin and 10 Greek letters; for six Latin letters, the draft gave new alternate shapes. A request to extend OCR-B with Vietnamese accents was rejected. Other than previous versions of the standard, which specified glyph shapes via reference drawings, the new revision would have included the shapes in machine-readable form. However, industry support for testing the new font could not be secured at the time, so the revision effort was halted in 1997. The working group described their findings in a technical report.

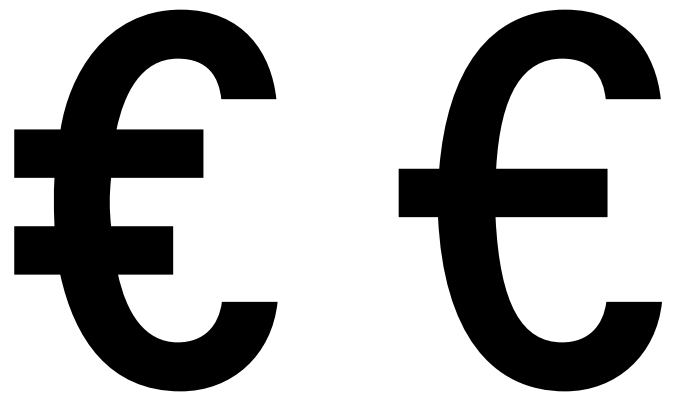
Two proposed variants for the OCR-B Euro sign

In June 1998, the European Committee for Standardization published a report for adding the Euro sign to OCR-B. The report proposed both a single-stroked and a double-stroked variant of the Euro sign, leaving the decision to further testing of OCR performance. Testing was difficult: the theoretical design methods used when the OCR-B glyphs were originally developed could no longer be reproduced, and the technological constraints of the 1960s were also not entirely relevant anymore in the OCR environments of the 1990s. A new test method was devised, using present-time OCR technology. The tests found no difference in OCR performance between the two Euro variants, and recommended the adoption of the double-stroked variant as it matches the conventional glyph shape. The project did not have funds to thoroughly test the glyph extensions of the 1993 proposal; initial results were inconclusive.

== Availability ==
Microsoft Office provides a version of Letterpress OCR-B produced by URW. It covers Windows-1252. Many vendors, including Adobe, still sell their versions of OCR-A and OCR-B.

The TeX typesetting system has a public domain Constant Strokewidth OCR-B font in METAFONT definition form. It was created by Norbert Swartz in 1995 and updated in 2010. It has a setting for square stroke ends. The definition has also been translated to METATYPE1, so the rounded version is available in TrueType and OpenType too.

A version of Constant Strokewidth OCR-B by Matthew Anderson has extended character coverage. It is available under CC-BY 4.0.
