= Ecma International =

Standards organization for information and communication systems

- Formation: 1961; 65 years ago
- Type: Standards organization
- Purpose: Standardization of information and communication technology and consumer electronics
- Headquarters: Geneva, Switzerland
- Region served: Worldwide
- Official language: English
- Key people: Theresa O’Connor (President); Jochen Friedrich (Vice-President, Executive Committee Chair); Chris Wilson (Treasurer); Samina Husain (Secretary General); Patrick Luthi (Chief Technical Officer)
- Main organ: General Assembly
- Budget: by membership dues
- Website: www.ecma-international.org
- Formerly called: European Computer Manufacturers Association

Ecma International (/ˈɛkmə/) is a nonprofit standards organization for information and communication systems. It acquired its current name in 1994, when the European Computer Manufacturers Association (ECMA) changed its name to reflect the organization's global reach and activities. As a consequence, the name is no longer considered an acronym and no longer uses full capitalization.

The organization was founded in 1961 to standardize computer systems in Europe. Membership is open to large and small companies worldwide that produce, market, or develop computer or communication systems, and have interest and experience in the areas addressed by the group's technical bodies. It is located in Geneva.

== Aims ==
Ecma aims to develop standards and technical reports to facilitate and standardize the use of information communication technology and consumer electronics; encourage the correct use of standards by influencing the environment in which they are applied; and publish these standards and reports in electronic and printed form. Ecma publications, including standards, can be freely copied by all interested parties without copyright restrictions. The development of standards and technical reports is done in co-operation with the appropriate national, European, and international organizations.

Unlike national standardization bodies, Ecma is a membership-based organization. It takes pride in the resulting "business-like" approach to standards, claimed to lead to better standards in less time, thanks to a less bureaucratic process focused on achieving results by consensus.

Ecma has actively contributed to worldwide standardization in information technology and telecommunications. More than 400 Ecma Standards and 100 Technical Reports have been published, more than 2/3 of which have also been adopted as international standards and/or technical reports.

The member list of Ecma International is available on its website. Its members include IT companies, IT trade associations, universities, foundations and public institutions.

== Standards ==
Ecma International is responsible for several standards, including:

- ECMA-6 – 7-bit Coded Character Set (based on ASCII), also approved as ISO/IEC 646
- ECMA-35 – Character Code Structure and Extension Techniques, also approved as ISO/IEC 2022
- ECMA-48 – Control Functions for Coded Character Sets, also approved as ISO/IEC 6429
- ECMA-107 – FAT12/FAT16 file system
- ECMA-119 – CD-ROM volume and file structure (later known as ISO 9660)
- ECMA-130 – CD-ROM "Yellow Book" format
- ECMA-262 – ECMAScript Language Specification (based on JavaScript)
- ECMA-334 – C# Language Specification
- ECMA-335 – Common Language Infrastructure (CLI)
- ECMA-341 – Environmental design considerations for electronic products
- ECMA-363 – Universal 3D File Format
- ECMA-367 – Eiffel: Analysis, design and programming Language (See Eiffel programming language)
- ECMA-372 – C++/CLI Language Specification
- ECMA-376 – Office Open XML (later known as ISO/IEC 29500)
- ECMA-377 – Holographic Versatile Disc (HVD) Recordable Cartridges
- ECMA-378 – Read-Only Memory Holographic Versatile Disc (HVD-ROM)
- ECMA-388 – Open XML Paper Specification
- ECMA-402 – ECMAScript Internationalization API Specification
- ECMA-404 – JSON
- ECMA-408 – Dart language specification

=== Java programming language ===
Although Sun Microsystems submitted its Java programming language to Ecma, Sun subsequently withdrew the submission. Thus, Ecma is not responsible for the standardization of Java.

=== Office Open XML formats ===
Ecma is involved in the standardization of the Office Open XML format based on the XML office document formats by Microsoft. The Ecma Office Open XML maintenance process is performed by technical committee 45 (TC45).

== Technical committees ==
The Ecma standards are governed through technical committees assigned to particular areas or topics, such as:

- TC39 – ECMAScript
- TC45 – Office Open XML
- TC46 – Open XML Paper Specification (OpenXPS)
- TC49 – Programming languages (C#, Common Language Infrastructure, Eiffel)
- TC52 – Dart
- TC53 – ECMAScript Modules for Embedded Systems
- TC57 – High-Level Shading Language (HLSL)

== Eco declaration ==
In Ecma International Standard 370, Ecma joined with the Scandinavian IT Eco Declaration organisation to put forward a guideline for informing consumers about the environmental practices of the manufacturers of ICT and consumer electronics products.

The IT Eco Declaration includes information on the environmental practices of the manufacturer as well as product features, such as environmentally conscious design, batteries, acoustic noise, electrical safety, energy consumption, chemical emissions, substances and materials included, and packaging. This makes it easy to compare different suppliers and their products, as they all present the environmental features of their products in the same way, through a common industry standard reporting form.

== See also ==
- List of Ecma standards
- European Committee for Standardization
- International Electrotechnical Commission (IEC)
- International Organization for Standardization (ISO)
