= List of ISO standards 8000–9999 =

This is a list of published (Note: This list generally excludes draft versions.) International Organization for Standardization (ISO) standards and other deliverables. (Note: ISO deliverables include "specifications" (ISO/PAS, ISO/TS), "reports" (ISO/TR), etc, which are not referred to by ISO as "standards".) For a complete and up-to-date list of all the ISO standards, see the ISO catalogue.

The standards are protected by copyright and most of them must be purchased. However, about 300 of the standards produced by ISO and IEC's Joint Technical Committee 1 (JTC 1) have been made freely and publicly available.

== ISO 8000 – ISO 8999 ==
- ISO 8000 Data quality
- ISO 8002:1986 Mechanical vibrations – Land vehicles – Method for reporting measured data
- ISO 8015:2011 Geometrical product specifications (GPS) – Fundamentals – Concepts, principles and rules
- ISO 8041:2005 Human response to vibration - Measuring instrumentation
  - ISO 8041-1:2017 Part 1: General purpose vibration meters
- ISO 8042:1988 Shock and vibration measurements – Characteristics to be specified for seismic pick-ups
- ISO 8044:2015 Corrosion of metals and alloys – Basic terms and definitions
- ISO 8048:1984 Technical drawings – Construction drawings – Representation of views, sections and cuts
- ISO 8049:2016 Ferronickel shot - Sampling for analysis
- ISO 8050:1988 Ferronickel ingots or pieces - Sampling for analysis
- ISO 8062 Geometrical product specifications (GPS) - Dimensional and geometrical tolerances for moulded parts
  - ISO 8062-1:2007 Part 1: Vocabulary
  - ISO/TS 8062-2:2013 Part 2: Rules
  - ISO 8062-3:2007 Part 3: General dimensional and geometrical tolerances and machining allowances for castings
  - ISO 8062-4:2017 Part 4: General tolerances for castings using profile tolerancing in a general datum system
- ISO 8063 Information processing – Data interchange on 6,30 mm (0.25 in) wide magnetic tape cartridge using IMFM recording at 252 ftpmm (6 400 ftpi)
  - ISO 8063-1:1986 Part 1: Mechanical, physical and magnetic properties
  - ISO 8063-2:1986 Part 2: Track format and method of recording for data interchange in start/stop mode
- ISO 8064:1985 Information processing – Reels for 12,7 mm (0,5 in) wide magnetic tapes – Sizes 16, 18 and 22
- ISO/IEC 8072:1996 Information technology – Open systems interconnection – Transport service definition
- ISO/IEC 8073:1997 Information technology – Open Systems Interconnection – Protocol for providing the connection-mode transport service
- ISO 8088:1994 Equipment for olive cultivation and olive oil production – Vocabulary
- ISO 8090:1990 Cycles – Terminology
- ISO 8107:1993 Nuclear power plants - Maintainability - Terminology
- ISO 8109:1990 Banking and related financial services – Securities – Format of Eurobonds
- ISO 8114:1990 Textile machinery and accessories – Spindles for ring-spinning and doubling machines – List of equivalent terms
- ISO 8116 Textile machinery and accessories – Beams for winding
  - ISO 8116-1:1995 Part 1: General vocabulary
- ISO 8119 Textile machinery and accessories – Needles for knitting machines – Terminology
  - ISO 8119-1:1989 Part 1: Latch-type needles
  - ISO 8119-2:1989 Part 2: Bearded needles
  - ISO 8119-3:1992 Part 3: Compound needles
- ISO/IEC 81346: Industrial systems, installations and equipment and industrial products – structuring principles and reference designations
- ISO 8147:1995 Shipbuilding and marine structures – Derrick rigs and component parts – Vocabulary
- ISO 8152:1984 Earth-moving machinery – Operation and maintenance – Training of mechanics
- ISO 8153 Aerospace fluid systems and components – Vocabulary
  - ISO 8153-1:2009 Part 1: Hose assemblies
- ISO 8157:2015 Fertilizers and soil conditioners – Vocabulary
- ISO 8159:1987 Textiles – Morphology of fibres and yarns – Vocabulary
- ISO 8160:1987 Textiles – Textured filament yarns – Vocabulary
- ISO 8178 Reciprocating internal combustion engines - Exhaust emission measurement
- ISO 8180 Ductile iron pipelines – Polyethylene sleeving for site application
- ISO 8199:2005 Water quality – General guidance on the enumeration of micro-organisms by culture
- ISO/IEC 8208:2000 Information technology – Data communications – X.25 Packet Layer Protocol for Data Terminal Equipment
- ISO/IEC 8211:1994 Information technology - Specification for a data descriptive file for information interchange
- ISO 8217:2017 Petroleum products - Fuels (class F) - Specifications of marine fuels
- ISO 8229:1991 Operations and baths relating to dry-cleaning machines – Vocabulary
- ISO 8277:2013 Ships and marine technology – Pipework and machinery – Information transfer
- ISO 8297:1994 Acoustics – Determination of sound power levels of multisource industrial plants for evaluation of sound pressure levels in the environment – Engineering method
- ISO 8316:1987 Measurement of liquid flow in closed conduits – Method by collection of the liquid in a volumetric tank
- ISO 8317:2015 Child-resistant packaging - Requirements and testing procedures for reclosable packages
- ISO 8319 Orthopaedic instruments – Drive connections
  - ISO 8319-1:1996 Part 1: Keys for use with screws with hexagon socket heads
  - ISO 8319-2:1986 Part 2: Screwdrivers for single slot head screws, screws with cruciate slot and cross-recessed head screws
- ISO/IEC 8326:1996 Information technology – Open Systems Interconnection – Session service definition
- ISO/IEC 8327 Information technology – Open Systems Interconnection – Connection-oriented Session protocol
  - ISO/IEC 8327-1:1996 Protocol specification
  - ISO/IEC 8327-2:1996 Protocol Implementation Conformance Statement (PICS) proforma
- ISO 8330:2014 Rubber and plastics hoses and hose assemblies - Vocabulary
- ISO 8333:1985 Liquid flow measurement in open channels by weirs and flumes – V-shaped broad-crested weirs
- ISO 8343:1985 Ferronickel - Determination of silicon content - Gravimetric method
- ISO/IEC 8348:2002 Information technology – Open Systems Interconnection – Network service definition
- ISO 8362 Injection containers and accessories
  - ISO 8362-1:2009 Part 1: Injection vials made of glass tubing
  - ISO 8362-2:2015 Part 2: Closures for injection vials
  - ISO 8362-3:2001 Part 3: Aluminium caps for injection vials
  - ISO 8362-4:2011 Part 4: Injection vials made of moulded glass
  - ISO 8362-5:2016 Part 5: Freeze drying closures for injection vials
  - ISO 8362-6:2010 Part 6: Caps made of aluminium-plastics combinations for injection vials
  - ISO 8362-7:2006 Part 7: Injection caps made of aluminium-plastics combinations without overlapping plastics part
- ISO/TR 8363:1997 Measurement of liquid flow in open channels — General guidelines for selection of method [Withdrawn: replaced by ISO 18365]
- ISO 8368:1999 Hydrometric determinations – Flow measurements in open channels using structures – Guidelines for selection of structure
- ISO 8373:2012 Manipulating industrial robots – Vocabulary
- ISO 8378 Information processing – Data interchange on 130 mm (5.25 in) flexible disk cartridges using modified frequency modulation recording at 7 958 ftprad, 3,8 tpmm (96 tpi), on both sides
  - ISO 8378-1:1986 Part 1: Dimensional, physical and magnetic characteristics
  - ISO 8378-2:1986 Part 2: Track format A
  - ISO 8378-3:1986 Part 3: Track format B
- ISO 8384:2000 Ships and marine technology – Dredgers – Vocabulary
- ISO 8388:1998 Knitted fabrics – Types – Vocabulary
- ISO 8421 Fire protection - Vocabulary
  - ISO 8421-1:1987 Part 1: General terms and phenomena of fire
  - ISO 8421-2:1987 Part 2: Structural fire protection
  - ISO 8421-6:1987 Part 6: Evacuation and means of escape
  - ISO 8421-7:1987 Part 7: Explosion detection and suppression means
- ISO 8422:2006 Sequential sampling plans for inspection by attributes
- ISO 8423:2008 Sequential sampling plans for inspection by variables for percent nonconforming (known standard deviation)
- ISO 8429:1986 Optics and optical instruments – Ophthalmology – Graduated dial scale
- ISO 8439:1990 Forms design - Basic layout
- ISO 8440:1986 Location of codes in trade documents
- ISO/IEC 8441 Information technology – High density digital recording (HDDR)
  - ISO/IEC 8441-1:1991 Part 1: Unrecorded magnetic tape for (HDDR) applications
  - ISO/IEC 8441-2:1991 Part 2: Guide for interchange practice
- ISO 8459:2009 Information and documentation - Bibliographic data element directory for use in data exchange and enquiry
- ISO 8462 Information processing – Data interchange on 6,30 mm (0.25 in) magnetic tape cartridge using GCR recording at 394 ftpmm (10 000 ftpi), 39 cpmm (1 000 cpi)
  - ISO 8462-1:1986 Part 1: Mechanical, physical and magnetic properties
  - ISO 8462-2:1986 Part 2: Streaming mode
- ISO/IEC 8473 Information technology – Protocol for providing the connectionless-mode network service
  - ISO/IEC 8473-1:1998 Protocol specification
  - ISO/IEC 8473-2:1996 Part 2: Provision of the underlying service by an ISO/IEC 8802 subnetwork
  - ISO/IEC 8473-3:1995 Provision of the underlying service by an X.25 subnetwork
  - ISO/IEC 8473-4:1995 Provision of the underlying service by a subnetwork that provides the OSI data link service
  - ISO/IEC 8473-5:1997 Provision of the underlying service by ISDN circuit-switched B-channels
- ISO/IEC 8480:1995 Information technology – Telecommunications and information exchange between systems – DTE/DCE interface back-up control operation using ITU-T Recommendation V.24 interchange circuits
- ISO/IEC 8481:1996 Information technology – Telecommunications and information exchange between systems – DTE to DTE direct connections
- ISO/IEC 8482:1993 Information technology – Telecommunications and information exchange between systems – Twisted pair multipoint interconnections
- ISO/IEC 8484:2014 Information technology – Magnetic stripes on savingsbooks
- ISO 8485:1989 Programming languages - APL
- ISO 8498:1990 Woven fabrics – Description of defects – Vocabulary
- ISO 8499:2003 Knitted fabrics – Description of defects – Vocabulary
- ISO 8501 Preparation of steel substrates before application of paints and related products – Visual assessment of surface cleanliness
  - ISO 8501-1:2007 Part 1: Rust grades and preparation grades of uncoated steel substrates and of steel substrates after overall removal of previous coatings
  - ISO 8501-2:1994 Part 2: Preparation grades of previously coated steel substrates after localized removal of previous coatings
  - ISO 8501-3:2006 Part 3: Preparation grades of welds, edges and other areas with surface imperfections
  - ISO 8501-4:2006 Part 4: Initial surface conditions, preparation grades and flash rust grades in connection with high-pressure water jetting
- ISO 8502 Preparation of steel substrates before application of paints and related products - Tests for the assessment of surface cleanliness
  - ISO 8502-2:2017 Part 2: Laboratory determination of chloride on cleaned surfaces
  - ISO 8502-3:2017 Part 3: Assessment of dust on steel surfaces prepared for painting (pressure-sensitive tape method)
  - ISO 8502-4:2017 Part 4: Guidance on the estimation of the probability of condensation prior to paint application
  - ISO 8502-5:1998 Part 5: Measurement of chloride on steel surfaces prepared for painting (ion detection tube method
  - ISO 8502-6:2006 Part 6: Extraction of soluble contaminants for analysis - The Bresle method
  - ISO 8502-9:1998 Part 9: Field method for the conductometric determination of water-soluble salts
  - ISO 8502-11:2006 Part 11: Field method for the turbidimetric determination of water-soluble sulfate
- ISO 8503 Preparation of steel substrates before application of paints and related products - Surface roughness characteristics of blast-cleaned steel substrates
  - ISO 8503-1:2012 Part 1: Specifications and definitions for ISO surface profile comparators for the assessment of abrasive blast-cleaned surfaces
  - ISO 8503-2:2012 Part 2: Method for the grading of surface profile of abrasive blast-cleaned steel - Comparator procedure
  - ISO 8503-3:2012 Part 3: Method for the calibration of ISO surface profile comparators and for the determination of surface profile - Focusing microscope procedure
  - ISO 8503-4:2012 Part 4: Method for the calibration of ISO surface profile comparators and for the determination of surface profile - Stylus instrument procedure
  - ISO 8503-5:2017 Part 5: Replica tape method for the determination of the surface profile
- ISO 8504 Preparation of steel substrates before application of paints and related products - Surface preparation methods
  - ISO 8504-1:2000 Part 1: General principles
  - ISO 8504-2:2000 Part 2: Abrasive blast-cleaning
  - ISO 8504-3:1993 Part 3: Hand- and power-tool cleaning
- ISO 8506:2024 Information technology — Automatic identification and data capture technology — AIDC application in industrial construction
- ISO 8512 Surface plates
  - ISO 8512-1:1990 Part 1: Cast iron
  - ISO 8512-2:1990 Part 2: Granite
- ISO/TR 8517:1988 Rubber- or plastics-covered rollers – Glossary
- ISO 8525:2008 Airborne noise emitted by machine tools – Operating conditions for metal-cutting machines
- ISO 8528 Reciprocating internal combustion engine driven alternating current generating sets
  - ISO 8528-1:2005 Part 1: Application, ratings and performance
  - ISO 8528-2:2005 Part 2: Engines
  - ISO 8528-3:2005 Part 3: Alternating current generators for generating sets
  - ISO 8528-4:2005 Part 4: Controlgear and switchgear
  - ISO 8528-5:2013 Part 5: Generating sets
  - ISO 8528-6:2005 Part 6: Test methods
  - ISO 8528-7:2017 Part 7: Technical declarations for specification and design
  - ISO 8528-8:2016 Part 8: Requirements and tests for low-power generating sets
  - ISO 8528-9:2017 Part 9: Measurement and evaluation of mechanical vibrations
  - ISO 8528-10:1998 Part 10: Measurement of airborne noise by the enveloping surface method
  - ISO 8528-12:1997 Part 12: Emergency power supply to safety services
  - ISO 8528-13:2016 Part 13: Safety
- ISO 8529 Reference neutron radiations
  - ISO 8529-1:2001 Part 1: Characteristics and methods of production
  - ISO 8529-2:2000 Part 2: Calibration fundamentals of radiation protection devices related to the basic quantities characterizing the radiation field
  - ISO 8529-3:1998 Part 3: Calibration of area and personal dosimeters and determination of response as a function of energy and angle of incidence
- ISO 8532:1995 Securities – Format for transmission of certificate numbers
- ISO 8536 Infusion equipment for medical use
  - ISO 8536-1:2011 Part 1: Infusion glass bottles
  - ISO 8536-2:2010 Part 2: Closures for infusion bottles
  - ISO 8536-3:2009 Part 3: Aluminium caps for infusion bottles
  - ISO 8536-4:2010 Part 4: Infusion sets for single use, gravity feed
  - ISO 8536-5:2004 Part 5: Burette infusion sets for single use, gravity feed
  - ISO 8536-6:2016 Part 6: Freeze drying closures for infusion bottles
  - ISO 8536-7:2009 Part 7: Caps made of aluminium-plastics combinations for infusion bottles
  - ISO 8536-8:2015 Part 8: Infusion sets for single use with pressure infusion apparatus
  - ISO 8536-9:2015 Part 9: Fluid lines for single use with pressure infusion equipment
  - ISO 8536-10:2015 Part 10: Accessories for fluid lines for single use with pressure infusion equipment
  - ISO 8536-11:2015 Part 11: Infusion filters for single use with pressure infusion equipment
  - ISO 8536-12:2007 Part 12: Check valves
  - ISO 8536-13:2016 Part 13: Graduated flow regulators for single use with fluid contact
  - ISO 8536-14:2016 Part 14: Clamps and flow regulators for transfusion and infusion equipment without fluid contact
- ISO 8537:2016 Sterile single-use syringes, with or without needle, for insulin
- ISO 8540:1993 Open front mechanical power presses - Vocabulary
- ISO 8548 Prosthetics and orthotics – Limb deficiencies
  - ISO 8548-1:1989 Part 1: Method of describing limb deficiencies present at birth
  - ISO 8548-2:1993 Part 2: Method of describing lower limb amputation stumps
  - ISO 8548-3:1993 Part 3: Method of describing upper limb amputation stumps
  - ISO 8548-4:1998 Part 4: Description of causal conditions leading to amputation
  - ISO 8548-5:2003 Part 5: Description of the clinical condition of the person who has had an amputation
- ISO 8549 Prosthetics and orthotics - Vocabulary
  - ISO 8549-1:1989 Part 1: General terms for external limb prostheses and external orthoses
  - ISO 8549-2:1989 Part 2: Terms relating to external limb prostheses and wearers of these prostheses
  - ISO 8549-3:1989 Part 3: Terms relating to external orthoses
  - ISO 8549-4:2014 Part 4: Terms relating to limb amputation
- ISO/TR 8550 Guidance on the selection and usage of acceptance sampling systems for inspection of discrete items in lots
  - ISO/TR 8550-1:2007 Part 1: Acceptance sampling
  - ISO/TR 8550-2:2007 Part 2: Sampling by attributes
  - ISO/TR 8550-3:2007 Part 3: Sampling by variables
- ISO 8551:2003 Prosthetics and orthotics – Functional deficiencies – Description of the person to be treated with an orthosis, clinical objectives of treatment, and functional requirements of the orthosis
- ISO 8552:2004 Milk – Estimation of psychrotrophic microorganisms – Colony-count technique at 21 degrees C (Rapid method)
- ISO 8553:2004 Milk – Enumeration of microorganisms – Plate-loop technique at 30 degrees C
- ISO 8559:1989 Garment construction and anthropometric surveys – Body dimensions [Withdrawn: replaced by ISO 8559-1:2017]
- ISO 8559 Size designation of clothes
  - ISO 8559-1:2017 Part 1: Anthropometric definitions for body measurement
  - ISO 8559-2:2017 Part 2: Primary and secondary dimension indicators
- ISO 8560:1986 Technical drawings – Construction drawings – Representation of modular sizes, lines and grids
- ISO 8568:2007 Mechanical shock – Testing machines – Characteristics and performance
- ISO 8571 Information processing systems - Open Systems Interconnection - File Transfer, Access and Management
  - ISO 8571-1:1988 Part 1: General introduction
  - ISO 8571-2:1988 Part 2: Virtual Filestore Definition
  - ISO 8571-3:1988 Part 3: File Service Definition
  - ISO 8571-4:1988 Part 4: File Protocol Specification
  - ISO/IEC 8571-5:1990 Part 5: Protocol Implementation Conformance Statement Proforma
- ISO 8573 Compressed air
  - ISO 8573-1:2010 Contaminants and purity classes
  - ISO 8573-2:2007 Test methods for oil aerosol content
  - ISO 8573-3:1999 Test methods for measurement of humidity
  - ISO 8573-4:2001 Test methods for solid particle content
  - ISO 8573-5:2001 Test methods for oil vapour and organic solvent content
  - ISO 8573-6:2003 Test methods for gaseous contaminant content
  - ISO 8573-7:2003 Test method for viable microbiological contaminant content
  - ISO 8573-8:2004 Test methods for solid particle content by mass concentration
  - ISO 8573-9:2004 Test methods for liquid water content
- ISO 8579 Acceptance code for gear units
  - ISO 8579-1:2002 Part 1: Test code for airborne sound
- ISO 8583 Financial transaction card originated messages – Interchange message specifications
- ISO 8586:2012 Sensory analysis – General guidelines for the selection, training and monitoring of selected assessors and expert sensory assessors
- ISO 8596:2009 Ophthalmic optics – Visual acuity testing – Standard optotype and its presentation
- ISO 8598 Optics and optical instruments – Focimeters
  - ISO 8598-1:2014 Part 1: General purpose instruments
- ISO 8600 Endoscopes – Medical endoscopes and endotherapy devices (Note: The exact wording of this title varies between parts. This is the wording of the most recently published part.)
  - ISO 8600-1:2015 Part 1: General requirements
  - ISO 8600-2:2015 Part 2: Particular requirements for rigid bronchoscopes
  - ISO 8600-3:1997 Part 3: Determination of field of view and direction of view of endoscopes with optics
  - ISO 8600-4:2014 Part 4: Determination of maximum width of insertion portion
  - ISO 8600-5:2005 Part 5: Determination of optical resolution of rigid endoscopes with optics
  - ISO 8600-6:2005 Part 6: Vocabulary
  - ISO 8600-7:2012 Part 7: Basic requirements for medical endoscopes of water-resistant type
- ISO 8601:2019 Data elements and interchange formats – Information interchange – Representation of dates and times
- ISO/IEC 8602:1995 Information technology – Protocol for providing the OSI connectionless-mode transport service
- ISO 8604:1988 Plastics – Prepregs – Definitions of terms and symbols for designations
- ISO 8608:2016 Mechanical vibration – Road surface profiles – Reporting of measured data
- ISO 8612:2009 Ophthalmic instruments – Tonometers
- ISO/IEC 8613 Information technology – Open Document Architecture (ODA) and interchange format
- ISO 8614:1997 Ski bindings – Vocabulary
- ISO 8615:1991 Implants for surgery – Fixation devices for use in the ends of the femur in adults
- ISO 8624:2011 Ophthalmic optics – Spectacle frames – Measuring system and terminology
- ISO 8625 Aerospace – Fluid systems – Vocabulary
  - ISO 8625-1:1993 Part 1: General terms and definitions related to pressure
  - ISO 8625-2:1991 Part 2: General terms and definitions relating to flow
  - ISO 8625-3:1991 Part 3: General terms and definitions relating to temperature
  - ISO 8625-4:2011 Part 4: General terms and definitions relating to control/actuation systems
- ISO 8626:1989 Servo-hydraulic test equipment for generating vibration – Method of describing characteristics
- ISO 8630 Information processing – Data interchange on 130 mm (5.25 in) flexible disk cartridges using modified frequency modulation recording at 13 262 ftprad, on 80 tracks on each side
  - ISO 8630-1:1987 Part 1: Dimensional, physical and magnetic characteristics
  - ISO 8630-2:1987 Part 2: Track format A for 77 tracks
  - ISO 8630-3:1987 Part 3: Track format B for 80 tracks
- ISO/IEC 8631:1989 Information technology - Program constructs and conventions for their representation
- ISO/IEC 8632 Information technology – Computer graphics – Metafile for the storage and transfer of picture description information
  - ISO/IEC 8632-1:1999 Part 1: Functional specification
  - ISO/IEC 8632-2:1992 Part 2: Character encoding [withdrawn 2001-06-21]
  - ISO/IEC 8632-3:1999 Part 3: Binary encoding
  - ISO/IEC 8632-4:1999 Part 4: Clear text encoding
- ISO 8637:2010 Cardiovascular implants and extracorporeal systems – Haemodialysers, haemodiafilters, haemofilters and haemoconcentrators
- ISO 8638:2010 Cardiovascular implants and extracorporeal systems – Extracorporeal blood circuit for haemodialysers, haemodiafilters and haemofilters
- ISO 8640 Textile machinery and accessories – Flat warp knitting machines
  - ISO 8640-1:2004 Part 1: Vocabulary of basic structure and knitting elements
  - ISO 8640-2:2004 Part 2: Vocabulary of warp let-off, fabric take-up and batching
  - ISO 8640-3:2002 Part 3: Vocabulary of patterning devices
  - ISO 8640-4:1996 Part 4: Stitch bonding machines and stitch bonding devices
- ISO 8648:1988 Information processing systems – Open Systems Interconnection – Internal organization of the Network Layer
- ISO/IEC 8650 Information technology – Open Systems Interconnection – Protocol specification for the Association Control Service Element
  - ISO/IEC 8650-2:1997 Protocol Implementation Conformance Statement (PICS) proforma
- ISO 8651 Information technology – Computer graphics – Graphical Kernel System (GKS) language bindings
  - ISO 8651-1:1988 Part 1: FORTRAN
  - ISO 8651-2:1988 Part 2: Pascal
  - ISO 8651-3:1988 Part 3: Ada
  - ISO/IEC 8651-4:1995 Part 4: C
- ISO/IEC 8652:2012 Information technology – Programming languages – Ada
- ISO 8653:1986 Jewellery – Ring-sizes – Definition, measurement and designation
- ISO 8655 Piston-operated volumetric apparatus
  - ISO 8655-1:2002 Part 1: Terminology, general requirements and user recommendations
  - ISO 8655-2:2002 Part 2: Piston pipettes
  - ISO 8655-3:2002 Part 3: Piston burettes
  - ISO 8655-4:2002 Part 4: Dilutors
  - ISO 8655-5:2002 Part 5: Dispensers
  - ISO 8655-6:2002 Part 6: Gravimetric methods for the determination of measurement error
  - ISO 8655-7:2005 Part 7: Non-gravimetric methods for the assessment of equipment performance
- ISO 8669 Urine collection bags
  - ISO 8669-1:1988 Part 1: Vocabulary
- ISO 8670 Ostomy collection bags
  - ISO 8670-1:1988 Part 1: Vocabulary
- ISO 8691 Petroleum products – Low levels of vanadium in liquid fuels – Determination by flameless atomic absorption spectrometry after ashing
- ISO 8695:2010 Tools for pressing - Punches - Nomenclature and terminology
- ISO/TR 8713:2012 Electrically propelled road vehicles – Vocabulary
- ISO 8769:2016 Reference sources - Calibration of surface contamination monitors - Alpha-, beta- and photon emitters
- ISO 8777:1993 Information and documentation - Commands for interactive text searching
- ISO 8784 Pulp, paper and board – Microbiological examination
  - ISO 8784-1:2014 Part 1: Enumeration of bacteria and bacterial spores based on disintegration
- ISO 8785:1998 Geometrical Product Specification (GPS) - Surface imperfections - Terms, definitions and parameters
- ISO 8790:1987 Information processing systems - Computer system configuration diagram symbols and conventions
- ISO/IEC 8802 Information technology – Telecommunications and information exchange between systems – Local and metropolitan area networks – Specific requirements
  - ISO/IEC/IEEE 8802-A:2015 Part A: Overview and architecture
  - ISO/IEC TR 8802-1:2001 Part 1: Overview of Local Area Network Standards
  - ISO/IEC/IEEE 8802-1Q:2016 Part 1Q: Bridges and bridged networks
  - ISO/IEC/IEEE 8802-1X:2013 Part 1X: Port-based network access control
  - ISO/IEC/IEEE 8802-1AB:2017 Part 1AB: Station and media access control connectivity discovery
  - ISO/IEC/IEEE 8802-1AE:2013 Part 1AE: Media access control (MAC) security
  - ISO/IEC/IEEE 8802-1AR:2014 Part 1AR: Secure device identity
  - ISO/IEC/IEEE 8802-1AS:2014 Part 1AS: Timing and synchronization for time-sensitive applications in bridged local area networks
  - ISO/IEC/IEEE 8802-1AX:2016 Part 1AX: Link aggregation
  - ISO/IEC/IEEE 8802-1BA:2016 Part 1BA: Audio video bridging (AVB) systems
  - ISO/IEC/IEEE 8802-1BR:2016 Part 1BR: Virtual bridged local area networks – Bridge port extension
  - ISO/IEC 8802-2:1998 Part 2: Logical link control
  - ISO/IEC/IEEE 8802-3:2017 Part 3: Standard for Ethernet
  - ISO/IEC/IEEE 8802-3-1:2015 Part 3-1: Standard for management information base (MIB) – Definitions for Ethernet
  - ISO/IEC 8802-5:1998 Part 5: Token Ring access method and physical layer specifications
  - ISO/IEC/IEEE 8802-11:2012 Part 11: Wireless LAN medium access control (MAC) and physical layer (PHY) specifications
  - ISO/IEC/IEEE 8802-15-4:2010 Part 15-4: Wireless medium access control (MAC) and physical layer (PHY) specifications for low-rate wireless personal area networks (WPANs)
  - ISO/IEC/IEEE 8802-22:2015 Part 22: Cognitive Wireless RAN Medium Access Control (MAC) and Physical Layer (PHY) Specifications: Policies and Procedures for Operation in the TV Bands
- ISO 8805 Information processing systems – Computer graphics – Graphical Kernel System for Three Dimensions (GKS-3D) functional description
- ISO/IEC 8806 Information technology – Computer graphics – Graphical Kernel System for Three Dimensions (GKS-3D) language bindings
  - ISO/IEC 8806-4 Part 4: C
- ISO 8807:1989 Information processing systems – Open Systems Interconnection – LOTOS – A formal description technique based on the temporal ordering of observational behaviour
- ISO 8811:2000 Earth-moving machinery – Rollers and compactors – Terminology and commercial specifications
- ISO 8812:2016 Earth-moving machinery – Backhoe loaders – Terminology and commercial specifications
- ISO 8815:1994 Aircraft – Electrical cables and cable harnesses – Vocabulary
- ISO/IEC 8822:1994 Information technology – Open Systems Interconnection – Presentation service definition
- ISO/IEC 8823 Information technology – Open Systems Interconnection – Connection-oriented presentation protocol
  - ISO/IEC 8823-1:1994 Protocol specification
  - ISO/IEC 8823-2:1997 Protocol Implementation Conformance Statement (PICS) proforma
- ISO/IEC 8824 Information technology – Abstract Syntax Notation One (ASN.1)
  - ISO/IEC 8824-1:2015 Specification of basic notation
  - ISO/IEC 8824-2:2015 Information object specification
  - ISO/IEC 8824-3:2015 Constraint specification
  - ISO/IEC 8824-4:2015 Parameterization of ASN.1 specifications
- ISO/IEC 8825 Information technology – ASN.1 encoding rules
  - ISO/IEC 8825-1:2015 Specification of Basic Encoding Rules (BER), Canonical Encoding Rules (CER) and Distinguished Encoding Rules (DER)
  - ISO/IEC 8825-2:2015 Specification of Packed Encoding Rules (PER)
  - ISO/IEC 8825-3:2015 Specification of Encoding Control Notation (ECN)
  - ISO/IEC 8825-4:2015 XML Encoding Rules (XER)
  - ISO/IEC 8825-5:2015 Mapping W3C XML schema definitions into ASN.1
  - ISO/IEC 8825-6:2015 Registration and application of PER encoding instructions
  - ISO/IEC 8825-7:2015 Part 7: Specification of Octet Encoding Rules (OER)
- ISO 8826 Technical drawings – Rolling bearings
  - ISO 8826-1:1989 Part 1: General simplified representation
  - ISO 8826-2:1994 Part 2: Detailed simplified representation
- ISO 8827:1988 Implants for surgery – Staples with parallel legs for orthopaedic use – General requirements
- ISO 8828:2014 Implants for surgery – Guidance on care and handling of orthopaedic implants
- ISO 8835 Inhalational anaesthesia systems
  - ISO 8835-7:2011 Part 7: Anaesthetic systems for use in areas with limited logistical supplies of electricity and anaesthetic gases
- ISO 8836:2014 Suction catheters for use in the respiratory tract
- ISO 8843:2005 Aircraft – Crimp-removable contacts for electrical connectors – Identification system
- ISO 8855:2011 Road vehicles – Vehicle dynamics and road-holding ability – Vocabulary
- ISO/IEC 8859 Information technology – 8-bit single-byte coded graphic character sets
  - ISO/IEC 8859-1:1998 Part 1: Latin alphabet No. 1
  - ISO/IEC 8859-2:1999 Part 2: Latin alphabet No. 2
  - ISO/IEC 8859-3:1999 Part 3: Latin alphabet No. 3
  - ISO/IEC 8859-4:1998 Part 4: Latin alphabet No. 4
  - ISO/IEC 8859-5:1999 Part 5: Latin/Cyrillic alphabet
  - ISO/IEC 8859-6:1999 Part 6: Latin/Arabic alphabet
  - ISO/IEC 8859-7:2003 Part 7: Latin/Greek alphabet
  - ISO/IEC 8859-8:1999 Part 8: Latin/Hebrew alphabet
  - ISO/IEC 8859-9:1999 Part 9: Latin alphabet No. 5
  - ISO/IEC 8859-10:1998 Part 10: Latin alphabet No. 6
  - ISO/IEC 8859-11:2001 Part 11: Latin/Thai alphabet
  - ISO/IEC 8859-13:1998 Part 13: Latin alphabet No. 7
  - ISO/IEC 8859-14:1998 Part 14: Latin alphabet No. 8 (Celtic)
  - ISO/IEC 8859-15:1999 Part 15: Latin alphabet No. 9
  - ISO/IEC 8859-16:2001 Part 16: Latin alphabet No. 10
- ISO 8860 Information processing – Data interchange on 90 mm (3.5 in) flexible disk cartridges using modified frequency modulation recording at 7 958 ftprad on 80 tracks on each side
  - ISO 8860-1:1987 Part 1: Dimensional, physical and magnetic characteristics
  - ISO 8860-2:1987 Part 2: Track format
- ISO 8871 Elastomeric parts for parenterals and for devices for pharmaceutical use
  - ISO 8871-1:2003 Part 1: Extractables in aqueous autoclavates
  - ISO 8871-2:2003 Part 2: Identification and characterization
  - ISO 8871-3:2003 Part 3: Determination of released-particle count
  - ISO 8871-4:2006 Part 4: Biological requirements and test methods
  - ISO 8871-5:2016 Part 5: Functional requirements and testing
- ISO 8872:2003 Aluminium caps for transfusion, infusion and injection bottles – General requirements and test methods
- ISO/IEC 8877:1992 Information technology – Telecommunications and information exchange between systems – Interface connector and contact assignments for ISDN Basic Access Interface located at reference points S and T
- ISO/IEC 8878:1992 Information technology – Telecommunications and information exchange between systems – Use of X.25 to provide the OSI Connection-mode Network Service
- ISO 8879:1986 Information processing – Text and office systems – Standard Generalized Markup Language (SGML)
- ISO/IEC 8880 Information technology — Telecommunications and information exchange between systems — Protocol combinations to provide and support the OSI Network Service
  - ISO/IEC 8880-1:1990 Part 1: General principles [Withdrawn: replaced by ISO/IEC TR 13532:1995, now withdrawn without replacement]
  - ISO/IEC 8880-2:1992 Part 2: Provision and support of the connection-mode Network Service [Withdrawn: replaced by ISO/IEC TR 13532:1995, now withdrawn without replacement]
  - ISO/IEC 8880-3:1990 Part 3: Provision and support of the connectionless-mode Network Service [Withdrawn: replaced by ISO/IEC TR 13532:1995, now withdrawn without replacement]
- ISO/IEC 8881:1989 Information processing systems – Data communications – Use of the X.25 packet level protocol in local area networks
- ISO/IEC 8882 Information technology – Telecommunications and information exchange between systems – X.25 DTE conformance testing
  - ISO/IEC 8882-1:1996 Part 1: General principles
  - ISO/IEC 8882-2:2000 Part 2: Data link layer conformance test suite
  - ISO/IEC 8882-3:2000 Part 3: Packet layer conformance test suite
- ISO 8884:1989 Information processing — Text and office systems — Keyboards for multiple Latin-alphabet languages — Layout and operation [Withdrawn: replaced with ISO 9995-(1,7)]
- ISO 8885:1987 Information processing systems — Data communication — High-level data link control procedures — General purpose XID frame information field content and format [Withdrawn without replacement]
- ISO/IEC 8886:1996 Information technology – Open Systems Interconnection – Data link service definition
- ISO 8887 Technical product documentation – Design for manufacturing, assembling, disassembling and end-of-life processing
  - ISO 8887-1:2017 Part 1: General concepts and requirements
- ISO 8891:1998 Dental casting alloys with noble metal content of at least 25 % but less than 75 % [Withdrawn: replaced with ISO 22674]
- ISO 8909 Forage harvesters
  - ISO 8909-1:1994 Part 1: Vocabulary
- ISO 8910:1993 Machinery and equipment for working the soil – Mouldboard plough working elements – Vocabulary
- ISO 8927:1991 Earth-moving machinery – Machine availability – Vocabulary
- ISO 8930:1987 General principles on reliability for structures – List of equivalent terms
- ISO 8936:2017 Awnings for leisure accommodation vehicles - Requirements and test methods
- ISO 8954 Ferroalloys - Vocabulary
  - ISO 8954-1:1990 Part 1: Materials
  - ISO 8954-2:1990 Part 2: Sampling and sample preparation
  - ISO 8954-3:1990 Part 3: Sieve analysis
- ISO 8957:1996 Information and documentation - Hebrew alphabet coded character sets for bibliographic information interchange
- ISO 8965:2013 Logging industry – Technology – Terms and definitions
- ISO 8979:2004 Pliers and nippers for electronics - Nomenclature
- ISO 8980 Ophthalmic optics – Uncut finished spectacle lenses
  - ISO 8980-1:2017 Part 1: Specifications for single-vision and multifocal lenses
  - ISO 8980-2:2017 Part 2: Specifications for power-variation lenses
  - ISO 8980-3:2013 Part 3: Transmittance specifications and test methods
  - ISO 8980-4:2006 Part 4: Specifications and test methods for anti-reflective coatings
  - ISO 8980-5:2005 Part 5: Minimum requirements for spectacle lens surfaces claimed to be abrasion-resistant
- ISO 8999:2001 Reciprocating internal combustion engines - Graphical symbols

== ISO 9000 – ISO 9999 ==
- ISO 9000:2015 Quality management systems – Fundamentals and vocabulary
- ISO 9001:2015 Quality management systems – Requirements
- ISO/TS 9002:2016 Quality management systems – Guidelines for the application of ISO 9001:2015
- ISO 9004:2018 Managing for the sustained success of an organization – A quality management approach
- ISO/TR 9007:1987 Information processing systems - Concepts and terminology for the conceptual schema and the information base
- ISO 9019:1995 Securities – Numbering of certificates
- ISO 9022 Optics and optical instruments - Environmental test methods
  - ISO 9022-1:2016 Definitions, extent of testing
  - ISO 9022-2:2015 Cold, heat and humidity
  - ISO 9022-3:2015 Mechanical stress
  - ISO 9022-4:2014 Salt mist
  - ISO 9022-5:1994 Combined cold, low air pressure [Withdrawn: replaced by ISO 9022-23:2016]
  - ISO 9022-6:2015 Dust
  - ISO 9022-23:2016 Low pressure combined with cold, ambient temperature and dry or damp heat
- ISO 9031:1987 Air cargo equipment - Handling systems for unit load devices (ULDs) - Symbols for pictorial representation
- ISO 9036:1987 Information processing - Arabic 7-bit coded character set for information interchange
- ISO/IEC 9040:1997 Information technology – Open Systems Interconnection – Virtual Terminal Basic Class Service
- ISO/IEC 9041 Information technology – Open Systems Interconnection – Virtual Terminal Basic Class Protocol
  - ISO/IEC 9041-1:1997 Part 1: Specification
  - ISO/IEC 9041-2:1997 Part 2: Protocol Implementation Conformance Statement (PICS) proforma
- ISO 9045:1990 Industrial screens and screening – Vocabulary
- ISO 9050 Glass in building – Determination of light transmittance, solar direct transmittance, total solar energy transmittance, ultraviolet transmittance and related glazing factors
- ISO 9060: Solar energy -- Specification and classification of instruments for measuring hemispherical solar and direct solar radiation
- ISO/IEC 9066 Information technology – Open Systems Interconnection – Reliable Transfer (Note: The exact wording of this title varies between parts. This is the wording of the most recently published part.)
  - ISO/IEC 9066-1:1989 Part 1: Model and service definition
  - ISO/IEC 9066-2:1989 Part 2: Protocol specification
  - ISO/IEC 9066-3:1996 Protocol Implementation Conformance Statement (PICS) proforma
- ISO 9069:1988 Information processing – SGML support facilities – SGML Document Interchange Format (SDIF)
- ISO/IEC 9070:1991 Information technology - SGML support facilities - Registration procedures for public text owner identifiers
- ISO/IEC 9072 Information technology – Open Systems Interconnection – Remote Operations
  - ISO/IEC 9072-1:1989 Part 1: Model, notation and service definition
  - ISO/IEC 9072-2:1989 Part 2: Protocol specification
  - ISO/IEC 9072-3:1996 Protocol Implementation Conformance Statement (PICS) proforma
- ISO/IEC 9075 Information technology – Database languages – SQL
- ISO 9086 Wood – Methods of physical and mechanical testing – Vocabulary
  - ISO 9086-1:1987 Part 1: General concepts and macrostructure
- ISO 9092:2011 Textiles – Nonwovens – Definition
- ISO 9095:1990 Steel tubes – Continuous character marking and colour coding for material identification
- ISO 9123:2001 Measurement of liquid flow in open channels – Stage-fall-discharge relationships
- ISO/IEC 9126 Software engineering – Product quality
- ISO 9128:2006 Road vehicles - Graphical symbols to designate brake fluid types
- ISO 9141 Road vehicles – Diagnostic systems
  - ISO 9141-2 CARB requirements for interchange of digital information
  - ISO 9141-3 Verification of the communication between vehicle and OBD II scan tool
- ISO 9144:1991 Securities – Optical character recognition line – Position and structure
- ISO 9160:1988 Information processing - Data encipherment - Physical layer interoperability requirements
- ISO 9170 Terminal units for medical gas pipeline systems
  - ISO 9170-1:2017 Part 1: Terminal units for use with compressed medical gases and vacuum
  - ISO 9170-2:2008 Part 2: Terminal units for anaesthetic gas scavenging systems
- ISO/IEC 9171 Information technology - 130 mm optical disk cartridge, write once, for information interchange
  - ISO/IEC 9171-1:1990 Part 1: Unrecorded optical disk cartridge
  - ISO/IEC 9171-2:1990 Part 2: Recording format
- ISO 9175 Tubular tips for hand-held technical pens using India ink on tracing paper
  - ISO 9175-1:1988 Part 1: Definitions, dimensions, designation and marking
- ISO 9177 Mechanical pencils for technical drawings
  - ISO 9177-1:2016 Part 1: Classification, dimensions, performance requirements and testing
  - ISO 9177-2:1989 Part 2: Black leads – Classification and dimensions
  - ISO 9177-3:1994 Part 3: Black leads – Bending strengths of HB leads
- ISO 9180:1988 Black leads for wood-cased pencils – Classification and diameters
- ISO 9186 Graphical symbols - Test methods
  - ISO 9186-1:2014 Part 1: Method for testing comprehensibility
  - ISO 9186-2:2008 Part 2: Method for testing perceptual quality
  - ISO 9186-3:2014 Part 3: Method for testing symbol referent association
- ISO 9187 Injection equipment for medical use
  - ISO 9187-1:2010 Part 1: Ampoules for injectables
  - ISO 9187-2:2010 Part 2: One-point-cut (OPC) ampoules
- ISO 9195:1992 Liquid flow measurement in open channels – Sampling and analysis of gravel-bed material
- ISO 9196:1992 Liquid flow measurement in open channels – Flow measurements under ice conditions
- ISO 9211 Optics and photonics - Optical coatings
  - ISO 9211-1:2010 Part 1: Definitions
- ISO/TR 9212:2015 Hydrometry – Methods of measurement of bedload discharge
- ISO 9222 Technical drawings – Seals for dynamic application
  - ISO 9222-1:1989 Part 1: General simplified representation
  - ISO 9222-2:1989 Part 2: Detailed simplified representation
- ISO 9223 Corrosion of metals and alloys - Corrosivity of atmospheres - Classification, determination and estimation
- ISO 9224 Corrosion of metals and alloys - Corrosivity of atmospheres - Guiding values for the corrosivity categories
- ISO 9225 Corrosion of metals and alloys - Corrosivity of atmospheres - Measurement of environmental parameters affecting corrosivity of atmospheres
- ISO 9226 Corrosion of metals and alloys - Corrosivity of atmospheres - Determination of corrosion rate of standard specimens for the evaluation of corrosivity
- ISO 9227:2017 Corrosion tests in artificial atmospheres – Salt spray tests
- ISO 9229:2007 Thermal insulation - Vocabulary
- ISO 9230:2007 Information and documentation - Determination of price indexes for print and electronic media purchased by libraries
- ISO 9232:2003 Yogurt – Identification of characteristic microorganisms (Lactobacillus delbrueckii subsp. bulgaricus and Streptococcus thermophilus)
- ISO 9235:2013 Aromatic natural raw materials – Vocabulary
- ISO 9241 Ergonomics of human-system interaction
- ISO 9244:2008 Earth-moving machinery - Machine safety labels - General principles
- ISO 9245:1991 Earth-moving machinery – Machine productivity – Vocabulary, symbols and units
- ISO 9247:1990 Earth-moving machinery – Electrical wires and cables – Principles of identification and marking
- ISO/TS 9250 Earth-moving machinery – Multilingual listing of equivalent terms
  - ISO/TS 9250-1:2012 Part 1: General
  - ISO/TS 9250-2:2012 Part 2: Performance and dimensions
- ISO 9251:1987 Thermal insulation - Heat transfer conditions and properties of materials - Vocabulary
- ISO 9264:1988 Woodworking machines – Narrow belt sanding machines with sliding table or frame – Nomenclature
- ISO 9265:1988 Woodworking machines – Multi-spindle boring machines – Nomenclature
- ISO 9266:1988 Woodworking machines – Universal tool and cutter sharpeners – Nomenclature
- ISO 9267:1988 Woodworking machines – Bandsaw blade sharpening machines – Nomenclature
- ISO 9268:1988 Implants for surgery – Metal bone screws with conical under-surface of head – Dimensions
- ISO 9269:1988 Implants for surgery – Metal bone plates – Holes and slots corresponding to screws with conical under-surface
- ISO/IEC 9281 Information technology - Picture coding methods
  - ISO/IEC 9281-1:1990 Part 1: Identification
  - ISO/IEC 9281-2:1990 Part 2: Procedure for registration
- ISO/IEC 9282 Information processing - Coded representation of pictures
  - ISO/IEC 9282-1:1988 Part 1: Encoding principles for picture representation in a 7-bit or 8-bit environment
- ISO 9288:1989 Thermal insulation – Heat transfer by radiation – Physical quantities and definitions
- ISO/IEC 9293:1994 Information technology – Volume and file structure of disk cartridges for information interchange
- ISO 9295:2015 Acoustics - Determination of high-frequency sound power levels emitted by machinery and equipment
- ISO 9296:2017 Acoustics - Declared noise emission values of information technology and telecommunications equipment
- ISO 9300:2005 Measurement of gas flow by means of critical flow Venturi nozzles
- ISO 9308 Water quality – Enumeration of Escherichia coli and coliform bacteria
  - ISO 9308-1:2014 Part 1: Membrane filtration method for waters with low bacterial background flora
  - ISO 9308-2:2012 Part 2: Most probable number method
  - ISO 9308-3:1998 Part 3: Miniaturized method (Most Probable Number) for the detection and enumeration of E. coli in surface and waste water
- ISO 9314 Information processing systems Fibre Distributed Data Interface (FDDI)
  - ISO 9314-1:1989 Part 1: Token Ring Physical Layer Protocol (PHY)
  - ISO 9314-2:1989 Part 2: Token Ring Media Access Control (MAC)
  - ISO/IEC 9314-3:1990 Part 3: Physical Layer Medium Dependent (PMD)
  - ISO/IEC 9314-4:1999 Part 4: Single Mode Fibre Physical Layer Medium Dependent (SMF-PMD)
  - ISO/IEC 9314-5:1995 Part 5: Hybrid Ring Control (HRC)
  - ISO/IEC 9314-6:1998 Part 6: Station Management (SMT)
  - ISO/IEC 9314-7:1998 Part 7: Physical layer Protocol (PHY-2)
  - ISO/IEC 9314-8:1998 Part 8: Media Access Control-2 (MAC-2)
  - ISO/IEC 9314-9:2000 Part 9: Low-cost fibre physical layer medium dependent (LCF-PMD)
  - ISO/IEC 9314-13:1998 Part 13: Conformance Test Protocol Implementation Conformance Statement (CT-PICS) Proforma
  - ISO/IEC 9314-20:2001 Part 20: Abstract test suite for FDDI physical medium dependent conformance testing (FDDI PMD ATS)
  - ISO/IEC 9314-21:2000 Part 21: Abstract test suite for FDDI physical layer protocol conformance testing (FDDI PHY ATS)
  - ISO/IEC 9314-25:1998 Part 25: Abstract test suite for FDDI - Station Management Conformance Testing (SMT-ATS)
  - ISO/IEC 9314-26:2001 Part 26: Media Access Control Conformance Testing (MAC-ATS)
- ISO 9315:1989 Information processing systems - Interface between flexible disk cartridge drives and their host controllers
- ISO/IEC 9316:1995 Information technology - Small Computer System Interface-2
  - ISO/IEC 9316-2:2000 Information technology - Small computer system interface-2 (SCSI-2) - Part 2: Common Access Method (CAM) Transport and SCSI interface module
- ISO/IEC 9318 Information technology - Intelligent Peripheral Interface
  - ISO/IEC 9318-2:1990 Part 2: Device specific command set for magnetic disk drives
  - ISO/IEC 9318-3:1990 Part 3: Device generic command set for magnetic and optical disk drives
  - ISO/IEC 9318-4:2002 Part 4: Device generic command set for magnetic tape drives (IPI-3 tape)
- ISO 9334:2012 Optics and photonics - Optical transfer function - Definitions and mathematical relationships
- ISO 9335:2012 Optics and photonics - Optical transfer function - Principles and procedures of measurement
- ISO 9342 Optics and optical instruments – Test lenses for calibration of focimeters
  - ISO 9342-1:2005 Part 1: Test lenses for focimeters used for measuring spectacle lenses
  - ISO 9342-2:2005 Part 2: Test lenses for focimeters used for measuring contact lenses
- ISO 9346:2007 Hygrothermal performance of buildings and building materials – Physical quantities for mass transfer – Vocabulary
- ISO 9360 Anaesthetic and respiratory equipment – Heat and moisture exchangers (HMEs) for humidifying respired gases in humans
  - ISO 9360-1:2000 Part 1: HMEs for use with minimum tidal volumes of 250 ml
  - ISO 9360-2:2001 Part 2: HMEs for use with tracheostomized patients having minimum tidal volumes of 250 ml
- ISO 9362:2014 Banking – Banking telecommunication messages – Business identifier code (BIC)
- ISO 9368 Measurement of liquid flow in closed conduits by the weighing method – Procedures for checking installations
  - ISO 9368-1:1990 Part 1: Static weighing systems
- ISO 9394:2012 Ophthalmic optics – Contact lenses and contact lens care products – Determination of biocompatibility by ocular study with rabbit eyes
- ISO 9407 Shoe sizes – Mondopoint system of sizing and marking
- ISO 9431:1990 Construction drawings – Spaces for drawing and for text, and title blocks on drawing sheets
- ISO/TR 9464:2008 Guidelines for the use of ISO 5167:2003
- ISO 9488:1999 Solar energy - Vocabulary
- ISO 9493:2010 Geometrical product specifications (GPS) – Dimensional measuring equipment: Dial test indicators (lever type) – Design and metrological characteristics
- ISO/IEC 9496:2003 CHILL - The ITU-T programming language
- ISO 9506 Industrial automation systems - Manufacturing Message Specification
- ISO/IEC 9529 Information processing systems - Data interchange on 90 mm (3,5 in) flexible disk cartridges using modified frequency modulation recording at 15 916 ftprad, on 80 tracks on each side
- ISO/IEC 9541 Information technology – Font information interchange
  - ISO/IEC 9541-1:2012 Part 1: Architecture
  - ISO/IEC 9541-2:2012 Part 2: Interchange Format
  - ISO/IEC 9541-3:2012 Part 3: Glyph shape representation
  - ISO/IEC 9541-4:2009 Part 4: Harmonization to Open Font Format
- ISO 9542:1988 Information processing systems – Telecommunications and information exchange between systems – End system to Intermediate system routeing exchange protocol for use in conjunction with the Protocol for providing the connectionless-mode network service (ISO 8473)
- ISO 9543:1989 Information processing systems – Information exchange between systems – Synchronous transmission signal quality at DTE/DCE interfaces
- ISO/IEC 9545:1994 Information technology – Open Systems Interconnection – Application Layer structure
- ISO/TR 9547:1988 Programming language processors - Test methods - Guidelines for their development and acceptability
- ISO/IEC 9548 Information technology – Open Systems Interconnection – Connectionless Session protocol
  - ISO/IEC 9548-1:1996 Protocol specification
  - ISO/IEC 9548-2:1995 Protocol Implementation Conformance Statement (PICS) proforma
- ISO/IEC 9549:1990 Information technology – Galvanic isolation of balanced interchange circuit
- ISO 9555 Measurement of liquid flow in open channels – Tracer dilution methods for the measurement of steady flow
  - ISO 9555-1:1994 Part 1: General
  - ISO 9555-3:1992 Part 3: Chemical tracers
  - ISO 9555-4:1992 Part 4: Fluorescent tracers
- ISO 9564 Financial services – Personal Identification Number (PIN) management and security
- ISO 9568:1993 Cinematography – Background acoustic noise levels in theatres, review rooms and dubbing rooms
- ISO/IEC TR 9573:1988 Information processing - SGML support facilities - Techniques for using SGML
  - ISO/IEC TR 9573-11:2004 Part 11: Structure descriptions and style specifications for standards document interchange
  - ISO/IEC TR 9573-13:1991 Part 13: Public entity sets for mathematics and science
- ISO/IEC 9574:1992 Information technology – Provision of the OSI connection-mode network service by packet mode terminal equipment to an integrated services digital network (ISDN)
- ISO/IEC TR 9575:1995 Information technology – Telecommunications and information exchange between systems – OSI Routeing Framework
- ISO/IEC 9576 Information technology – Open Systems Interconnection – Connectionless Presentation protocol
  - ISO/IEC 9576-1:1995 Protocol specification
  - ISO/IEC 9576-2:1995 Protocol Implementation Conformance Statement (PICS) proforma
- ISO/IEC TR 9577:1999 Information technology – Protocol identification in the network layer
- ISO/IEC TR 9578:1990 Information technology – Communication interface connectors used in local area networks
- ISO/IEC 9579:2000 Information technology – Remote database access for SQL with security enhancement
- ISO 9583:1993 Implants for surgery – Non-destructive testing – Liquid penetrant inspection of metallic surgical implants
- ISO 9584:1993 Implants for surgery – Non-destructive testing – Radiographic examination of cast metallic surgical implants
- ISO 9585:1990 Implants for surgery – Determination of bending strength and stiffness of bone plates
- ISO/IEC 9592 Information technology – Computer graphics and image processing – Programmer's Hierarchical Interactive Graphics System (PHIGS)
- ISO/IEC 9593 Information technology – Computer graphics – Programmer's Hierarchical Interactive Graphics System (PHIGS) language bindings
- ISO/IEC 9594 Information technology – Open Systems Interconnection – The Directory
  - ISO/IEC 9594-1:2017 Part 1: Overview of concepts, models and services
  - ISO/IEC 9594-2:2017 Part 2: Models
  - ISO/IEC 9594-3:2017 Part 3: Abstract service definition
  - ISO/IEC 9594-4:2017 Part 4: Procedures for distributed operation
  - ISO/IEC 9594-5:2017 Part 5: Protocol specifications
  - ISO/IEC 9594-6:2017 Part 6: Selected attribute types
  - ISO/IEC 9594-7:2017 Part 7: Selected object classes
  - ISO/IEC 9594-8:2017 Part 8: Public-key and attribute certificate frameworks
  - ISO/IEC 9594-9:2017 Part 9: Replication
- ISO/IEC 9595:1998 Information technology – Open Systems Interconnection – Common management information service
- ISO/IEC 9596 Information technology – Open Systems Interconnection – Common management information protocol
  - ISO/IEC 9596-1:1998 Part 1: Specification
  - ISO/IEC 9596-2:1993 Protocol Implementation Conformance Statement (PICS) proforma
- ISO 9611:1996 Acoustics – Characterization of sources of structure-borne sound with respect to sound radiation from connected structures – Measurement of velocity at the contact points of machinery when resiliently mounted
- ISO 9613 Acoustics – Attenuation of sound during propagation outdoors
  - ISO 9613-1:1993 Part 1: Calculation of the absorption of sound by the atmosphere
  - ISO 9613-2:1996 Part 2: General method of calculation
- ISO 9614 Acoustics – Determination of sound power levels of noise sources using sound intensity
  - ISO 9614-1:1993 Part 1: Measurement at discrete points
  - ISO 9614-2:1996 Part 2: Measurement by scanning
  - ISO 9614-3:2002 Part 3: Precision method for measurement by scanning
- ISO 9626:2016 Stainless steel needle tubing for the manufacture of medical devices – Requirements and test methods
- ISO/IEC 9636 Information technology - Computer graphics - Interfacing techniques for dialogues with graphical devices (CGI) - Functional specification
  - ISO/IEC 9636-1:1991 Part 1: Overview, profiles, and conformance
  - ISO/IEC 9636-2:1991 Part 2: Control
  - ISO/IEC 9636-3:1991 Part 3: Output
  - ISO/IEC 9636-4:1991 Part 4: Segments
  - ISO/IEC 9636-5:1991 Part 5: Input and echoing
  - ISO/IEC 9636-6:1991 Part 6: Raster
- ISO/IEC 9637 Information technology - Computer graphics - Interfacing techniques for dialogues with graphical devices (CGI) – Data stream binding
  - ISO/IEC 9637-1:1994 Part 1: Character encoding
  - ISO/IEC 9637-2:1992 Part 2: Binary encoding
- ISO/IEC 9638 Information technology - Computer graphics - Interfacing techniques for dialogues with graphical devices (CGI) - Language bindings
  - ISO/IEC 9638-3:1994 Part 3: Ada
- ISO 9645:1990 Acoustics – Measurement of noise emitted by two-wheeled mopeds in motion – Engineering method
- ISO/IEC 9646 Information technology—Open Systems Interconnection—Conformance testing methodology and framework
  - ISO/IEC 9646-1:1994 Part 1: General concepts
  - ISO/IEC 9646-2:1994 Part 2: Abstract Test Suite specification
  - ISO/IEC 9646-3:1998 Part 3: The Tree and Tabular Combined Notation (TTCN)
  - ISO/IEC 9646-4:1994 Part 4: Test realization
  - ISO/IEC 9646-5:1994 Part 5: Requirements on test laboratories and clients for the conformance assessment process
  - ISO/IEC 9646-6:1994 Part 6: Protocol profile test specification
  - ISO/IEC 9646-7:1995 Part 7: Implementation Conformance Statements
- ISO 9660:1988 Information processing – Volume and file structure of CD-ROM for information interchange
- ISO/IEC 9661:1994 Information technology – Data interchange on 12,7 mm wide magnetic tape cartridges – 18 tracks, 1 491 data bytes per millimetre
- ISO 9662:1994 Aircraft equipment - Environmental and operating conditions for airborne equipment - Humidity, temperature and pressure tests
- ISO 9668:1990 Pulps — Determination of magnesium content — Flame atomic absorption spectrometric method [Withdrawn: replaced with ISO 12830]
- ISO 9687:2015 Dentistry - Graphical symbols for dental equipment
- ISO 9688:1990 Mechanical vibration and shock – Analytical methods of assessing shock resistance of mechanical systems – Information exchange between suppliers and users of analyses
- ISO 9696:2007 Water quality - Measurement of gross alpha activity in non-saline water - Thick source method
- ISO 9706:1994 Information and documentation – Paper for documents – Requirements for permanence
- ISO 9707:2008 Information and documentation - Statistics on the production and distribution of books, newspapers, periodicals and electronic publications
- ISO 9712:2012 Non-destructive testing - Qualification and certification of NDT personnel
- ISO 9713:2002 Neurosurgical implants – Self-closing intracranial aneurysm clips
- ISO 9714 Orthopaedic drilling instruments
  - ISO 9714-1:2012 Part 1: Drill bits, taps and countersink cutters
- ISO 9735:1988 Electronic data interchange for administration, commerce and transport (EDIFACT) – Application level syntax rules (Syntax version number: 4, Syntax release number: 2)
  - ISO 9735-1:2002 Part 1: Syntax rules common to all parts
  - ISO 9735-2:2002 Part 2: Syntax rules specific to batch EDI
  - ISO 9735-3:2002 Part 3: Syntax rules specific to interactive EDI
  - ISO 9735-4:2002 Part 4: Syntax and service report message for batch EDI (message type – CONTRL)
  - ISO 9735-5:2002 Part 5: Security rules for batch EDI (authenticity, integrity and non-repudiation of origin)
  - ISO 9735-6:2002 Part 6: Secure authentication and acknowledgement message (message type – AUTACK)
  - ISO 9735-7:2002 Part 7: Security rules for batch EDI (confidentiality)
  - ISO 9735-8:2002 Part 8: Associated data in EDI
  - ISO 9735-9:2002 Part 9: Security key and certificate management message (message type – KEYMAN)
  - ISO 9735-10:2014 Part 10: Syntax service directories
- ISO/IEC 9796 Information technology – Security techniques – Digital signature schemes giving message recovery
  - ISO/IEC 9796-2:2010 Part 2: Integer factorization based mechanisms
  - ISO/IEC 9796-3:2006 Part 3: Discrete logarithm based mechanisms
- ISO/IEC 9797 Information technology – Security techniques – Message Authentication Codes (MACs)
  - ISO/IEC 9797-1:2011 Part 1: Mechanisms using a block cipher
  - ISO/IEC 9797-2:2011 Part 2: Mechanisms using a dedicated hash-function
  - ISO/IEC 9797-3:2011 Part 3: Mechanisms using a universal hash-function
- ISO/IEC 9798 Information technology – Security techniques – Entity authentication
  - ISO/IEC 9798-1:2010 Part 1: General
  - ISO/IEC 9798-2:2008 Part 2: Mechanisms using symmetric encipherment algorithms
  - ISO/IEC 9798-3:1998 Part 3: Mechanisms using digital signature
  - ISO/IEC 9798-4:1999 Part 4: Mechanisms using a cryptographic check function
  - ISO/IEC 9798-5:2009 Part 5: Mechanisms using zero-knowledge techniques
  - ISO/IEC 9798-6:2010 Part 6: Mechanisms using manual data transfer
- ISO 9801:2009 Ophthalmic instruments – Trial case lenses
- ISO 9802:1996 Raw optical glass – Vocabulary
- ISO/IEC 9804:1998 Information technology – Open Systems Interconnection – Service definition for the Commitment, Concurrency and Recovery service element
- ISO/IEC 9805 Information technology – Open Systems Interconnection – Protocol for the Commitment, Concurrency and Recovery service element
  - ISO/IEC 9805-1:1998 Protocol specification
  - ISO/IEC 9805-2:1996 Protocol Implementation Conformance Statement (PICS) proforma
- ISO/TR 9824:2007 Hydrometry – Measurement of free surface flow in closed conduits
- ISO 9825:2005 Hydrometry – Field measurement of discharge in large rivers and rivers in flood
- ISO 9826:1992 Measurement of liquid flow in open channels – Parshall and SANIIRI flumes
- ISO 9827:1994 Measurement of liquid flow in open channels by weirs and flumes – Streamlined triangular profile weirs
- ISO/IEC 9834 Information technology – Open Systems Interconnection – Procedures for the operation of OSI Registration Authorities
  - ISO/IEC 9834-1:2012 General procedures and top arcs of the international object identifier tree
  - ISO/IEC 9834-2:1993 Part 2: Registration procedures for OSI document types
  - ISO/IEC 9834-3:2008 Registration of Object Identifier arcs beneath the top-level arc jointly administered by ISO and ITU-T
  - ISO/IEC 9834-4:1991 Part 4: Register of VTE Profiles
  - ISO/IEC 9834-5:1991 Part 5: Register of VT Control Object Definitions
  - ISO/IEC 9834-6:2005 Registration of application processes and application entities
  - ISO/IEC 9834-7:2008 Joint ISO and ITU-T Registration of International Organizations
  - ISO/IEC 9834-8:2014 Part 8: Generation of universally unique identifiers (UUIDs) and their use in object identifiers
  - ISO/IEC 9834-9:2008 Registration of object identifier arcs for applications and services using tag-based identification
- ISO 9846 Solar energy -- Calibration of a pyranometer using a pyrheliometer
- ISO 9847 Solar energy -- Calibration of field pyranometers by comparison to a reference pyranometer
- ISO 9849:2017 Optics and optical instruments - Geodetic and surveying instruments - Vocabulary
- ISO 9851:1990 Continuous mechanical handling equipment – Overhead electrical monorail conveyors – Definitions and safety rules
- ISO 9869 Thermal insulation – Building elements – In-situ measurements of thermal resistance and thermal transmittance
- ISO 9873:2017 Dentistry - Intra-oral mirrors
- ISO 9878:1990 Micrographics - Graphical symbols for use in microfilming
- ISO 9897:1997 Freight containers - Container equipment data exchange (CEDEX) - General communication codes
- ISO/IEC 9899:2018 Programming languages – C
- ISO 9902 Textile machinery – Noise test code
  - ISO 9902-1:2001 Part 1: Common requirements
  - ISO 9902-2:2001 Part 2: Spinning preparatory and spinning machinery
  - ISO 9902-3:2001 Part 3: Nonwoven machinery
  - ISO 9902-4:2001 Part 4: Yarn processing, cordage and rope manufacturing machinery
  - ISO 9902-5:2001 Part 5: Weaving and knitting preparatory machinery
  - ISO 9902-6:2001 Part 6: Fabric manufacturing machinery
  - ISO 9902-7:2001 Part 7: Dyeing and finishing machinery
- ISO 9926 Cranes – Training of operators
  - ISO 9926-1:1990 Part 1: General
  - ISO 9926-3:2016 Part 3: Tower cranes
- ISO/IEC/IEEE 9945:2009 Information technology – Portable Operating System Interface (POSIX®) Base Specifications, Issue 7
- ISO 9947:2005 Textile machinery and accessories – Two-for-one twisters – Vocabulary
- ISO 9949 Urine absorbing aids - Vocabulary
  - ISO 9949-1:1993 Part 1: Conditions of urinary incontinence
  - ISO 9949-2:1993 Part 2: Products
  - ISO 9949-3:1993 Part 3: Identification of product types
- ISO 9951:1993 Measurement of gas flow in closed conduits – Turbine meters
- ISO 9957 Fluid draughting media
  - ISO 9957-1:1992 Part 1: Water-based India ink – Requirements and test conditions
  - ISO 9957-2:1995 Part 2: Water-based non-India ink – Requirements and test conditions
  - ISO 9957-3:1997 Part 3: Water-based coloured draughting inks – Requirements and test conditions
- ISO 9958 Draughting media for technical drawings – Draughting film with polyester base
  - ISO 9958-1:1992 Part 1: Requirements and marking
  - ISO 9958-2:1992 Part 2: Determination of properties
- ISO 9959 Numerically controlled draughting machines – Drawing test for the evaluation of performance
  - ISO 9959-1:1992 Part 1: Vector plotters
- ISO 9960 Draughting instruments with or without graduation
  - ISO 9960-1:1992 Part 1: Draughting scale rules
- ISO 9961:1992 Draughting media for technical drawings – Natural tracing paper
- ISO 9962 Manually operated draughting machines
  - ISO 9962-1:1992 Part 1: Definitions, classification and designation
  - ISO 9962-2:1992 Part 2: Characteristics, performance, inspection and marking
- ISO/IEC 9973:2013 Information technology - Computer graphics, image processing and environmental data representation - Procedures for registration of items
- ISO 9984:1996 Information and documentation – Transliteration of Georgian characters into Latin characters
- ISO 9985:1996 Information and documentation – Transliteration of Armenian characters into Latin characters
- ISO 9992 Financial transaction cards – Messages between the integrated circuit card and the card accepting device
- ISO/IEC 9995 Information technology – Keyboard layouts for text and office systems
- ISO 9997:1999 Dental cartridge syringes
- ISO 9999 Assistive products for persons with disability – Classification and terminology
