= Albedometer =

Albedo measuring instrument

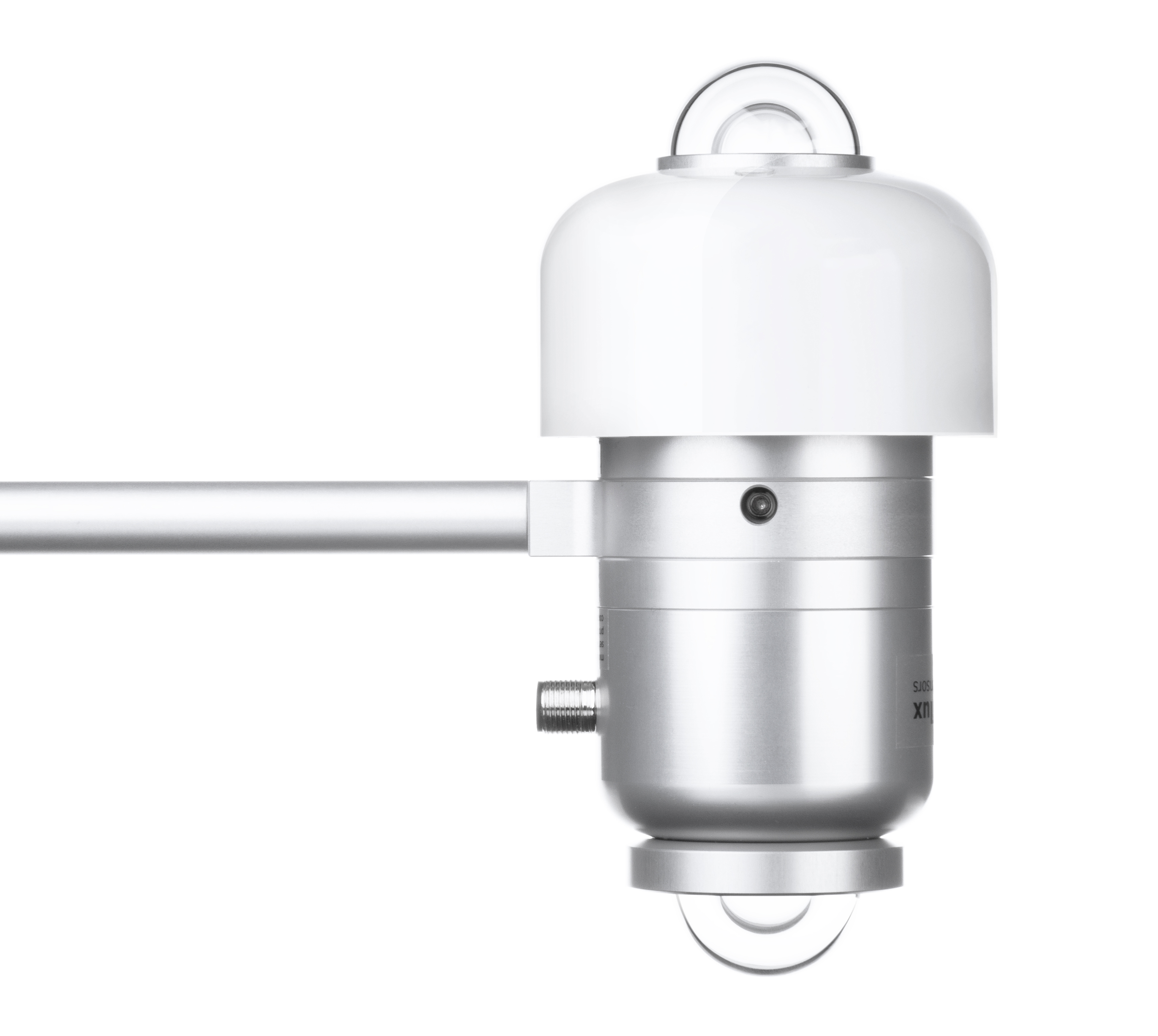
Typical albedometer consisting of two pyranometers, model SRA30.

An albedometer is an instrument used to measure the albedo (reflecting radiation) of a surface. An albedometer is mostly used to measure the reflectance of earths surface. It is also useful to evaluate thermal effects in buildings and generation capacity with bifacial solar photovoltaic panels. Often it consists of two pyranometers: one facing up towards the sky and one facing down towards the surface. From the ratio of incoming and reflecting radiation the albedo can be calculated.

== Measurement principle ==
The measurement of surface albedo of earths surface happens by using two pyranometers. The upfacing pyranometer measures the incoming global solar radiation. The downward facing pyranometer measures the reflected global solar radiation. The ratio of the reflected to the global radiation is the solar albedo and depends on the properties of the surface and the directional distribution of the incoming solar radiation. Typical values range from 4% for asphalt to 90% for fresh snow. Designs for a low-cost albedometer have been released with an open source hardware license which measures the reflection in 8 spectral bands in the visible light spectrum, additionally the system is equipped with a global navigation satellite system receiver, to georeference its position and an Inertial Measurement Unit to know its absolute orientation, make corrections in real time or detect errors.

=== PV Cell Albedometers ===
PV cell albedometer with upward and downward facing reference cells.

There are some albedometers designed with reference cells instead of traditional thermopile pyranometers. In these devices, one PV reference cell is oriented in the plane of array (POA) to measure the incident irradiance on the module surface, while another is oriented downward to measure the irradiance reflected from the ground. The albedo is then calculated as the ratio of reflected irradiance to POA irradiance.

This approach differs from the conventional two-pyranometer method, which calculates albedo as the ratio of reflected to global horizontal irradiance (GHI). For bifacial photovoltaic systems, POA-based measurements provide a closer estimate of the irradiance actually contributing to module performance, though the choice between POA and GHI depends on the modelling framework.

PV reference cells are commonly used in such albedometers. Their spectral response (typically 280–1200 nm) closely matches that of crystalline silicon PV modules, which reduces spectral mismatch effects compared to broadband pyranometers. Studies have also shown that albedo estimates can vary depending on ground surface type and environmental conditions.

== Standards ==
- ISO 9060
- WMO No.8
- ISO 9847
- ASTM G207-11.
