= ISO/IEC 8802-5 =

Joint ISO/IEC standard

ISO/IEC 8802-5 is a joint ISO/IEC standard that defines Token Ring access methods and physical layer specifications. The ISO/IEC 8802-5:1998 standard, part of the Local and Metropolitan Area Network (LAN) series, aligns with the ISO/IEC Open Systems Interconnection Basic Reference Model, focusing on the physical and data link layers. Its primary goal is to facilitate seamless interconnection of data processing equipment through a LAN employing the token-passing ring access method. The standard delineates the frame format, encompassing delimiters, addressing, and priority stacks. Additionally, it outlines the medium access control (MAC) protocol, supplemented by finite state machines and state tables, accompanied by algorithmic descriptions. The physical layer (PHY) functionalities, such as symbol encoding/decoding, symbol time, and latency buffering, are clearly defined. The standard elucidates the services offered by MAC to station management (SMT) and the reciprocal services provided by PHY to both SMT and MAC. Specifically tailored for commercial and light industrial applications, the LAN standard establishes guidelines for 4 and 16 Mbit/s shielded twisted pair attachments, including the medium interface connector (MIC). Notably, while token ring LANs in home and heavy industrial settings are not precluded, their consideration was not central to the standard's development. The document includes a Protocol Implementation Conformance Statement (PICS) proforma in its annex.
