= Ring size =

Tools for measuring ring and finger sizes

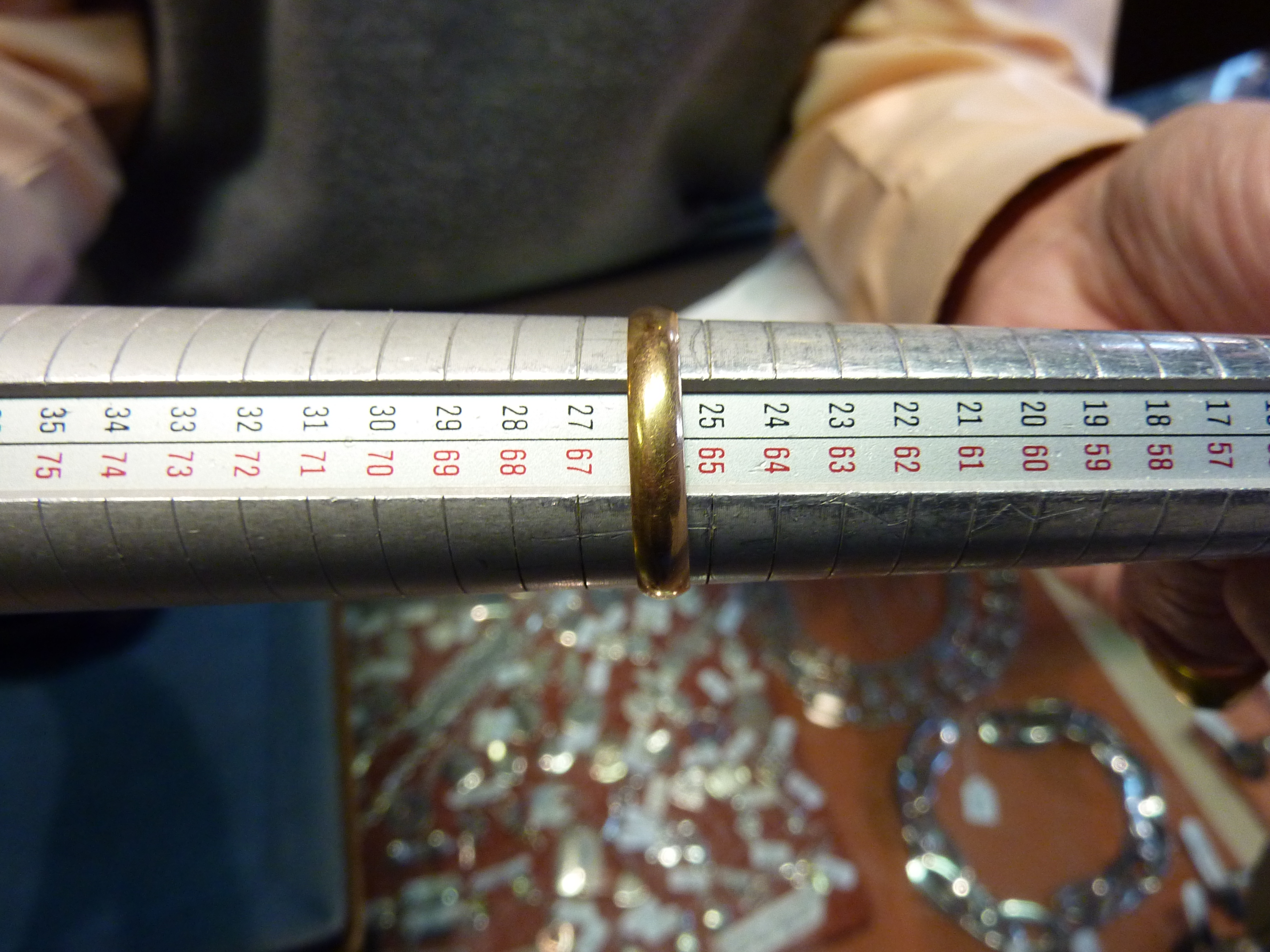
An analogic sizing ring stick

Ring size is a measurement used to denote the circumference (or sometimes the diameter) of jewellery rings and smart rings.

== Measuring tools ==
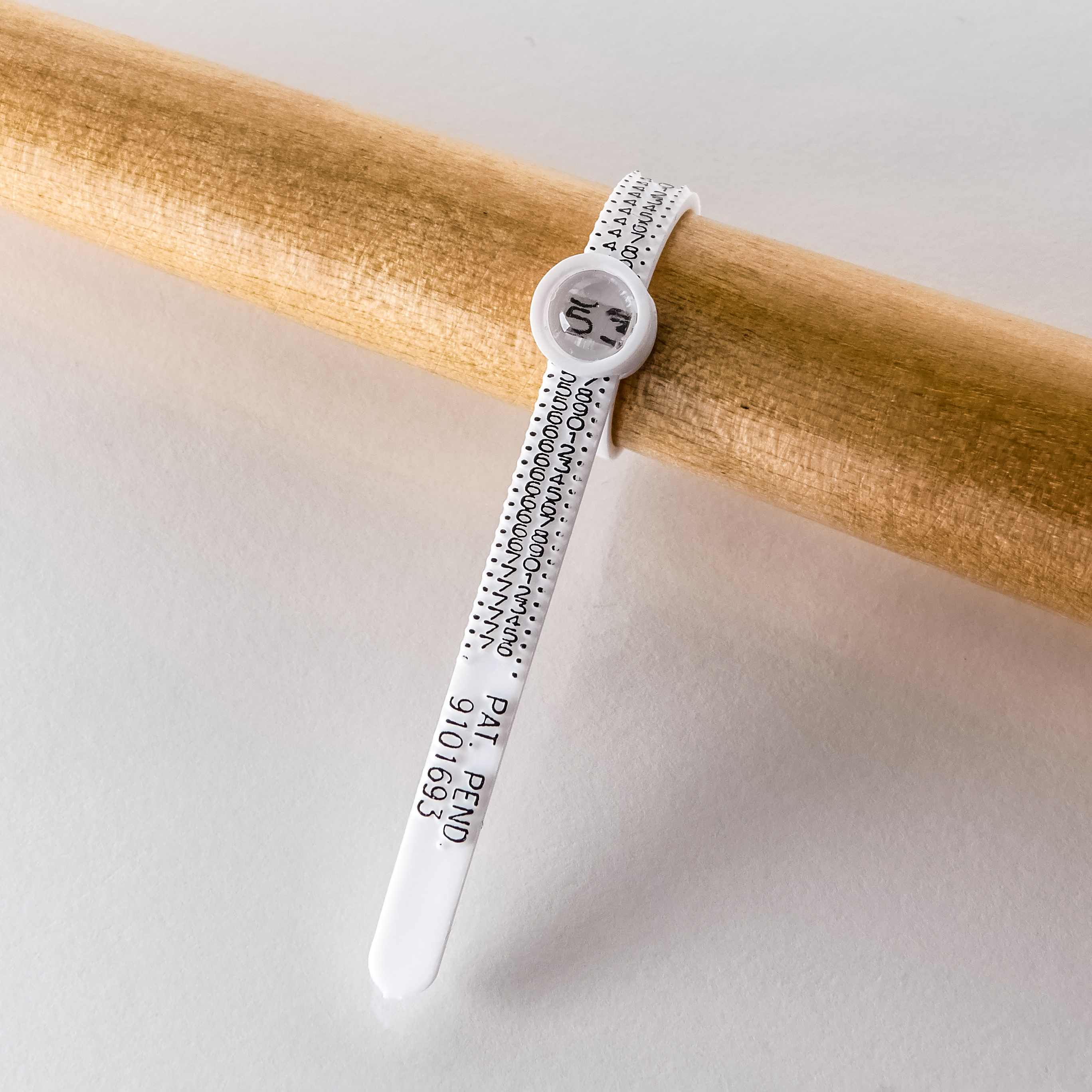
Plastic ring sizer tool for measuring the circumference of a finger in millimeters.

Ring sizes can be measured physically by a paper, plastic, or metal ring sizer (as a gauge) or by measuring the inner diameter of a ring that already fits.

Ring sticks are tools used to measure the inner size of a ring, and are typically made from plastic, delrin, wood, aluminium, or of multiple materials. Digital ring sticks can be used for highly accurate measurements.

== Measurement systems ==
=== International standard ===
ISO 8653:2016 defines standard ring sizes in terms of the inner circumference of the ring measured in millimetres. ISO sizes are used in Austria, France, Belgium, Nordic countries (Norway, Sweden, Denmark, Finland, Iceland), and other countries in Continental Europe.

Relationship between ISO size and internal diameter
ISO size (internal ring circumference, mm)	49	50	51	52	53	54	55	56	57	58	59	60	61	62	63	64	65	66	67	68	69	70	71	72
Internal diameter (mm)	15.6	15.9	16.2	16.6	16.9	17.2	17.5	17.8	18.1	18.5	18.8	19.1	19.4	19.7	20.1	20.4	20.7	21	21.3	21.6	22	22.3	22.6	22.9

=== Other traditional and regional systems ===
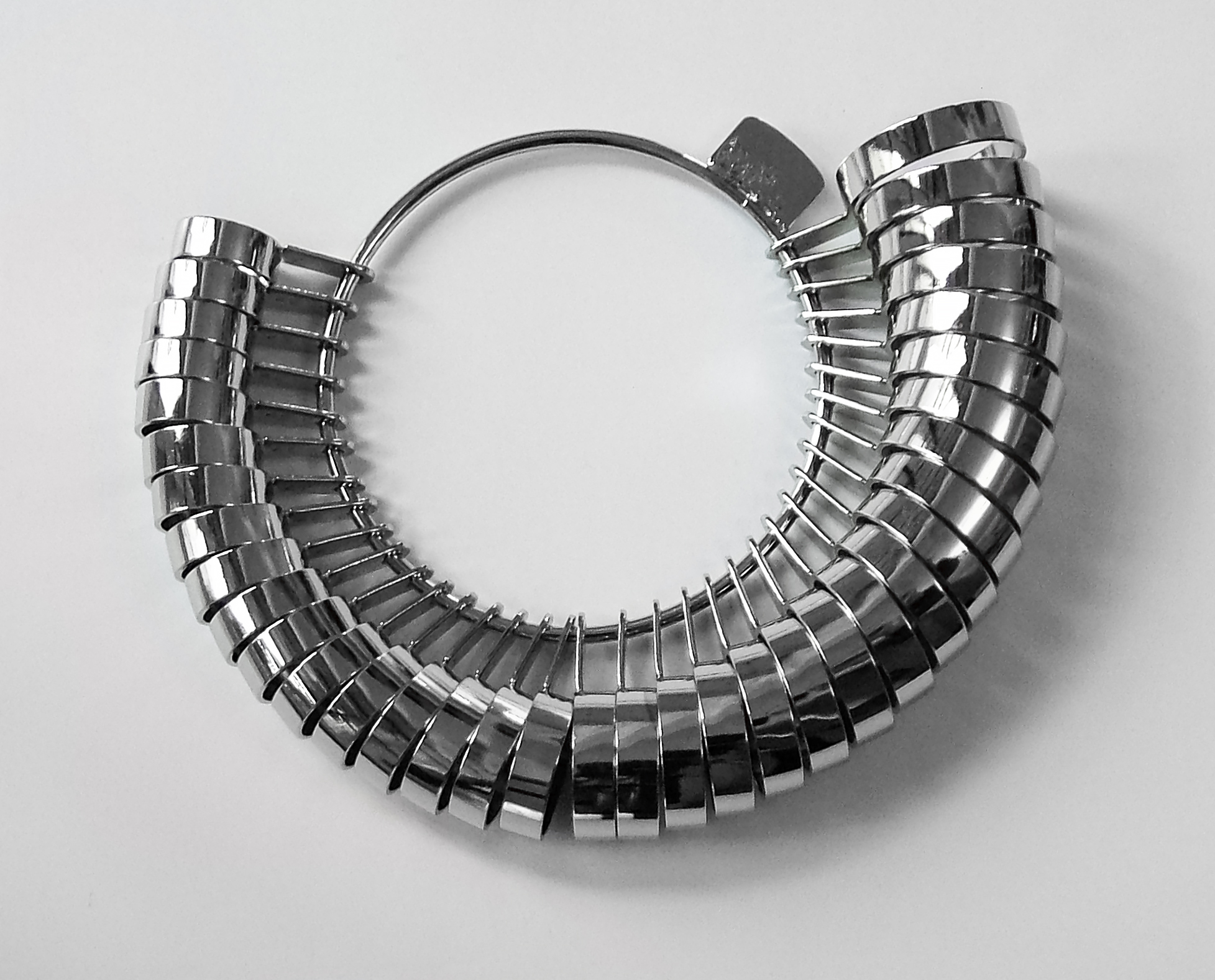
Metal ring size set for measuring fingers.

Other ring size measurement systems are used in areas that do not use ISO 8653:2016.

==== North America ====
In the United States, Canada, and Mexico, ring sizes are specified using a numerical scale with 1/4 steps, where whole sizes differ by 0.032 inches (0.81 mm) of internal diameter, equivalent to 0.1005 inches (2.55 mm) of internal circumference. The relationship of this size ($s_{NA}$) to ISO 8653:2016 circumference ($C_{ISO}$) is $C_{ISO} = 2.55 \times s_{NA} + 36.5$, while the relationship to ISO 8653:2016 diameter ($d_{ISO}$) is $d_{ISO} = 0.8128 \times s_{NA} + 11.63$.

The Circular of the Bureau of Standards summarizes the situation with this system: "While there apparently is only one standard in use in the United States, in reality, because of the lack of specific dimensions and because of the errors introduced by the adoption of a common commercial article as a pattern, there are many, although similar, standards." The standards are generally consistent and remain so. There does not appear to have been any improvement in the standard since then.

==== Ireland, United Kingdom, Australia ====
In Ireland, the United Kingdom and Australia, ring sizes are specified using an alphabetical scale with half sizes. Originally in 1945, the divisions were based on the ring inside diameter in steps of 1/64 inch (0.40 mm). However, in 1987 BSI updated the standard to the metric system so that one alphabetical size division equals 1.25 mm of circumferential length. For a baseline, ring size C has a circumference of 40 mm.

==== India, Japan, China ====
In India, Japan and China, ring sizes are specified using a numerical scale with whole sizes that do not have a linear correlation with diameter or circumference.

==== Germany and Netherlands ====
Netherlands, Germany, and sometimes Argentina use a standard (referred to as the German System) where ring sizes are defined by the diameter of the ring, measured in mm. This system may also be used at times in Russia.

==== Italy, Spain, Switzerland ====
In Italy, Spain, and Switzerland, ring sizes are specified as the circumference minus 40 mm: for example, size 10 in this system is equivalent to ISO 8653:2016 size 50. This may also be referred to as the Swiss Ring Size System.

==== Russia ====
In Russia, ring sizes are equal to the inner diameter rounded to whole and half numbers, sometimes to quarters, for example diameter 16.92 mm is equal to size 17, 16.1 mm is equal to size 16.

=== Equivalency table ===
Ring dimensions in various ring size measurement systems
Inside diameter		Inside circumference		Sizes				
(in)	(mm)	(in)	(mm) ISO (Continental Europe)	United States, Canada and Mexico	United Kingdom, Ireland, Australia, South Africa and New Zealand	East Asia (China, Japan, South Korea), South America	India	Italy, Spain, Netherlands, Switzerland
0.458	11.63	1.44	36.5	0				
0.466	11.84	1.46	37.2	1/4				
0.474	12.04	1.49	37.8	1/2	A			
0.482	12.24	1.51	38.5	3/4	A 1/2			
0.49	12.45	1.54	39.1	1	B	1		
0.498	12.65	1.56	39.7	1 1/4	B 1/2			
0.506	12.85	1.59	40.4	1 1/2	C			0.4
0.514	13.06	1.61	41.0	1 3/4	C 1/2		1	1
0.522	13.26	1.64	41.7	2	D	2	2	1.7
0.53	13.46	1.67	42.3	2 1/4	D 1/2			2.3
0.538	13.67	1.69	42.9	2 1/2	E	3	3	2.9
0.546	13.87	1.72	43.6	2 3/4	E 1/2		4	3.6
0.554	14.07	1.74	44.2	3	F	4		4.2
0.562	14.27	1.77	44.8	3 1/4	F 1/2	5	5	4.8
0.57	14.48	1.79	45.5	3 1/2	G			5.5
0.578	14.68	1.82	46.1	3 3/4	G 1/2	6	6	6.1
0.586	14.88	1.84	46.8	4	H	7		6.8
0.594	15.09	1.87	47.4	4 1/4	H 1/2		7	7.4
0.602	15.29	1.89	48.0	4 1/2	I	8	8	8
0.61	15.49	1.92	48.7	4 3/4	J		9	8.7
0.618	15.70	1.94	49.3	5	J 1/2	9		9.3
0.626	15.90	1.97	50.0	5 1/4	K		10	10
0.634	16.10	1.99	50.6	5 1/2	K 1/2	10		10.6
0.642	16.31	2.02	51.2	5 3/4	L		11	11.2
0.65	16.51	2.04	51.9	6	L 1/2	11	12	11.9
0.658	16.71	2.07	52.5	6 1/4	M	12		12.5
0.666	16.92	2.09	53.1	6 1/2	M 1/2	13	13	13.1
0.674	17.12	2.12	53.8	6 3/4	N			13.8
0.682	17.32	2.14	54.4	7	N 1/2	14	14	14.4
0.69	17.53	2.17	55.1	7 1/4	O		15	15.1
0.698	17.73	2.19	55.7	7 1/2	O 1/2	15		15.7
0.706	17.93	2.22	56.3	7 3/4	P		16	16.3
0.714	18.14	2.24	57.0	8	P 1/2	16	17	17
0.722	18.34	2.27	57.6	8 1/4	P 3/4			17.6
0.73	18.54	2.29	58.3	8 1/2	Q 1/4	17	18	18.3
0.738	18.75	2.32	58.9	8 3/4	R		19	18.9
0.746	18.95	2.34	59.5	9	R 1/2	18		19.5
0.754	19.15	2.37	60.2	9 1/4	S		20	20.2
0.762	19.35	2.39	60.8	9 1/2	S 1/2	19	21	20.8
0.77	19.56	2.42	61.4	9 3/4	T			21.4
0.778	19.76	2.44	62.1	10	T 1/2	20	22	22.1
0.786	19.96	2.47	62.7	10 1/4	U	21	23	22.7
0.794	20.17	2.49	63.4	10 1/2	U 1/2	22		23.4
0.802	20.37	2.52	64.0	10 3/4	V		24	24
0.81	20.57	2.54	64.6	11	V 1/2	23	25	24.6
0.818	20.78	2.57	65.3	11 1/4	W			25.3
0.826	20.98	2.59	65.9	11 1/2	W 1/2	24	26	25.9
0.834	21.18	2.62	66.6	11 3/4	X			26.6
0.842	21.39	2.65	67.2	12	X 1/2	25	27	27.2
0.85	21.59	2.67	67.8	12 1/4	Y		28	27.8
0.858	21.79	2.70	68.5	12 1/2	Y 1/2	26		28.5
0.866	22.00	2.72	69.1	12 3/4	Z		29	29.1
0.874	22.20	2.75	69.7	13	Z 1/2	27	30	29.7
0.882	22.40	2.77	70.4	13 1/4	Z1			30.4
0.89	22.61	2.80	71.0	13 1/2			31	31
0.898	22.81	2.82	71.7	13 3/4	Z2		32	31.7
0.906	23.01	2.85	72.3	14	Z3			32.3
0.914	23.22	2.87	72.9	14 1/4			33	32.9
0.922	23.42	2.90	73.6	14 1/2	Z4			33.6
0.93	23.62	2.92	74.2	14 3/4			34	34.2
0.938	23.83	2.95	74.8	15			35	34.8
0.946	24.03	2.97	75.5	15 1/4				35.5
0.954	24.23	3.00	76.1	15 1/2			36	36.1
0.962	24.43	3.02	76.8	15 3/4				36.8
0.97	24.64	3.05	77.4	16			37	37.4

== Resizing ==
Most rings can be resized; the method of doing so depends on the complexity of the ring and its material. Rings of soft material may be enlarged using mechanical stretching. For example, the ring may be enlarged using a rolling mill, a steel ring mandrel, or a Schwann Ring Stretcher.

=== Adding Material ===
In some cases, the ring may need to be cut open and material either added or removed before fusing the ring together again. The ring may be slightly heated to reveal any solder line so the jeweler can open the ring on the same seam so as to minimize the total number of solder joins on the ring.

=== Sizing beads ===
Small metal beads called sizing beads can be added to the inner circumference of a ring to:

- Decrease the effective inner diameter of a ring that is too big, to aid in holding the ring in place against the finger
- Counterbalance top-heavy rings
- Keep a ring from spinning for wearers whose knuckles are much larger than their finger base

Sizing beads are typically made of the same metal as the rest of the ring since it is easier to solder two similar metals.
