= ISO 9846 =

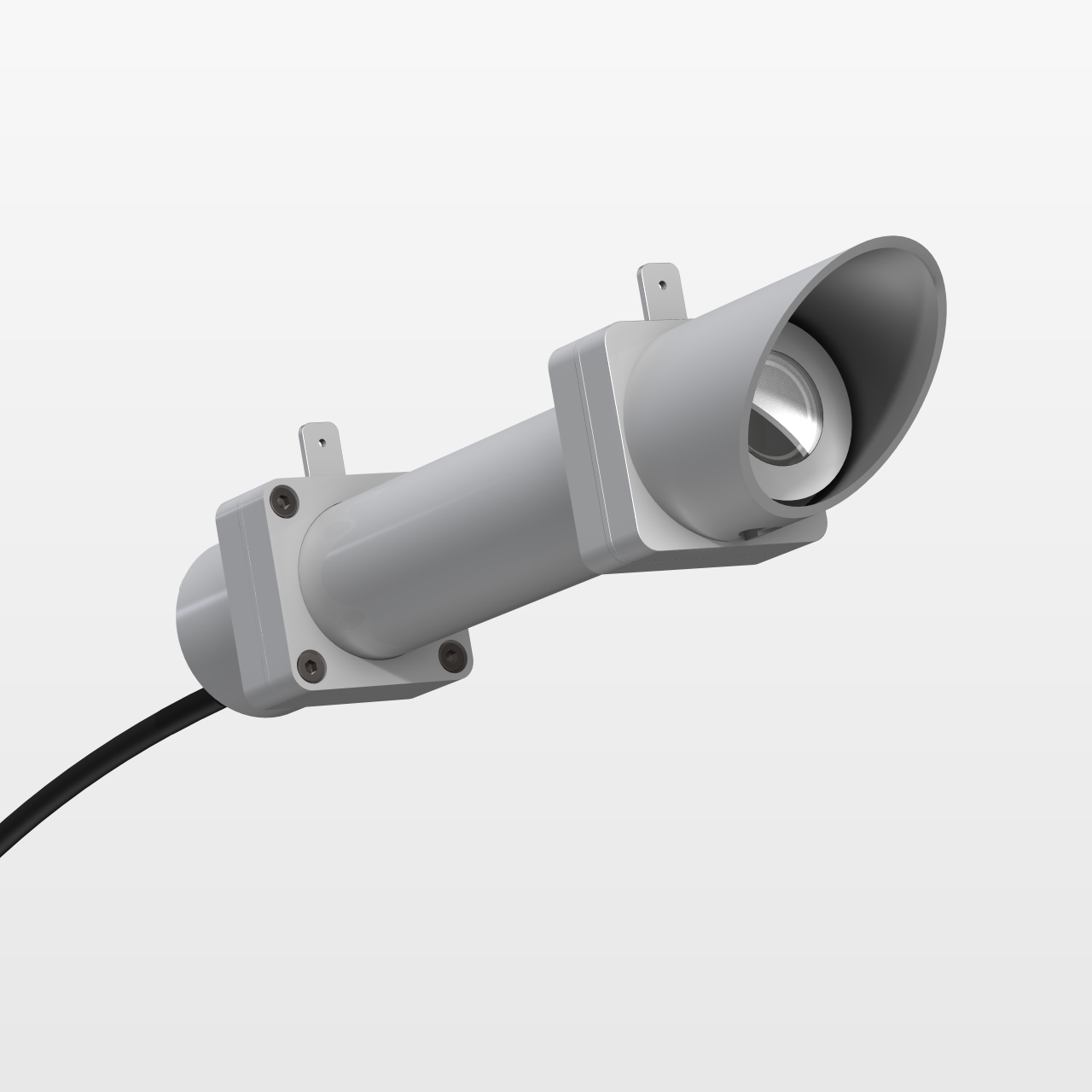
Typical pyrheliometer, model DR03.

ISO 9846, Solar energy -- Calibration of a pyranometer using a pyrheliometer, is the ISO standard for the calibration of a pyranometer using a pyrheliometer.
