= ISO/IEC 8652 =

ISO/IEC standard

ISO/IEC 8652 Information technology — Programming languages — Ada is the international standard for the computer programming language Ada. It was produced by the Ada Working Group, ISO/IEC JTC1/SC22/WG 9, of the International Organization for Standardization (ISO) and the International Electrotechnical Commission (IEC).

The latest edition is ISO/IEC 8652:2023, published May 2023. The text of the earlier 1995 version of the standard, with Technical Corrigendum 1 and Amendment 1, is freely available for download and online reading.
