= ISO 8691 =

International standard

ISO 8691:1994 Petroleum products — Low levels of vanadium in liquid fuels — Determination by flameless atomic absorption spectrometry after ashing is an ISO standard covering petroleum products, developed by ISO's Technical Committee (TC) 28: Petroleum products and lubricants. According to ISO's abstract, the standard "specifies a method for determining the vanadium content in the range of 0,4 mg/kg to 4,0 mg/kg in gas turbine fuels and domestic fuel oils by means of flameless atomic absorption spectrometry".
