= ISO 9847 =

ISO standard for the calibration of pyranometers

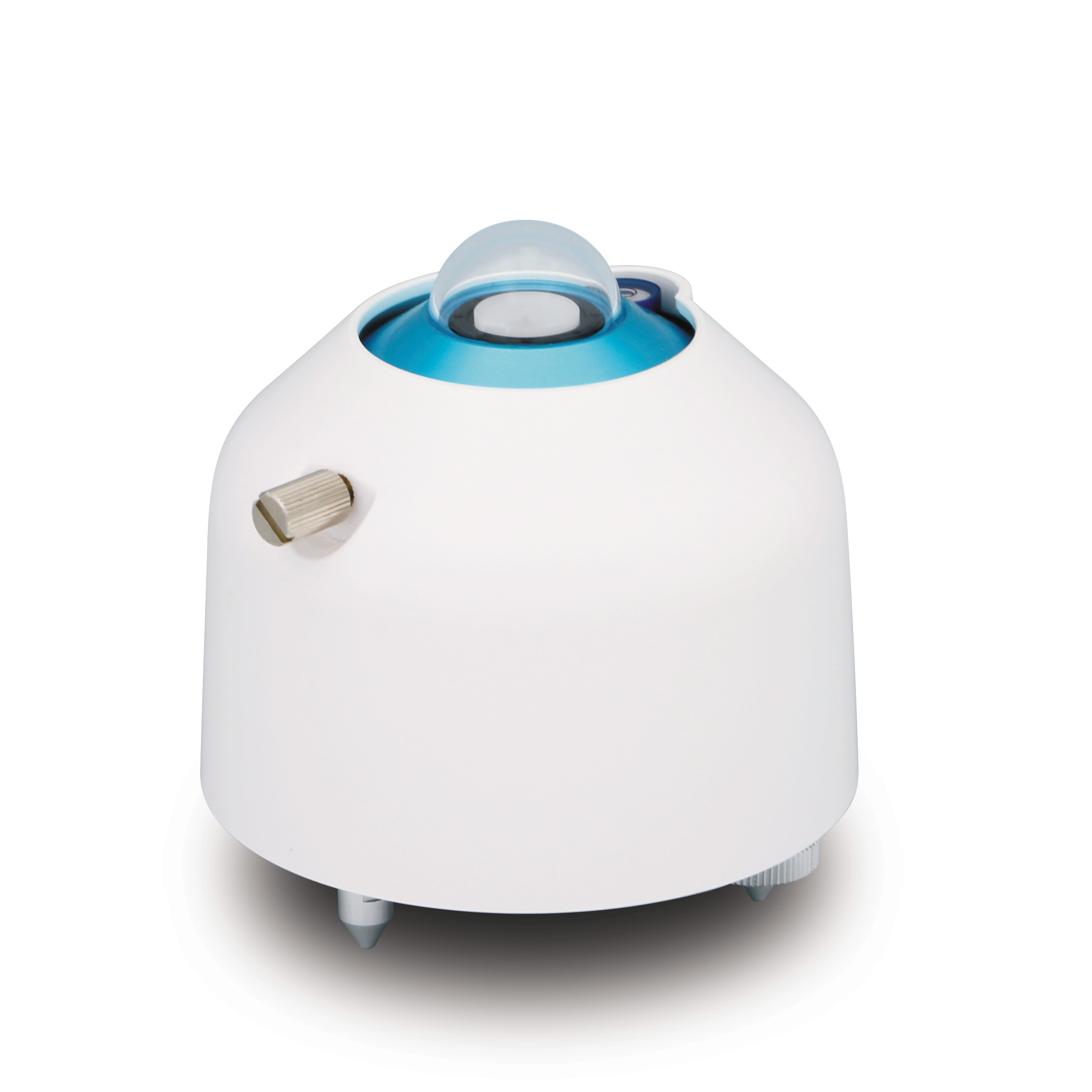
Model MS-80, Class A Pyranometer

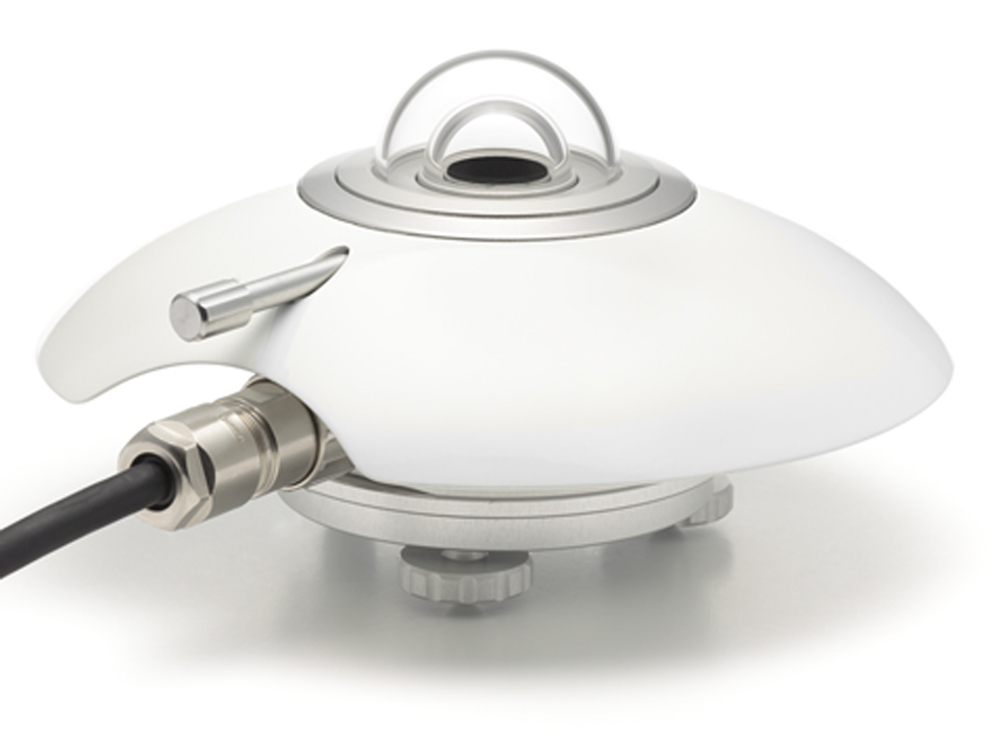
Typical pyranometer, model SR20.

ISO 9847, Solar energy — Calibration of field pyranometers by comparison to a reference pyranometer, is an ISO standard for the calibration of pyranometers.
