= Protocol implementation conformance statement =

Structured document specifying standards compliance

A protocol implementation conformance statement (PICS) is a structured document which asserts which specific requirements are met by a given implementation of a protocol standard. It is often completed as a record of formal protocol conformance test results, and some automated testing systems machine-author a PICS as output. A potential buyer or user of the implementation can consult the PICS to determine if it meets their requirements.

PICS may be used with TTCN-3.
