= ISO 9060 =

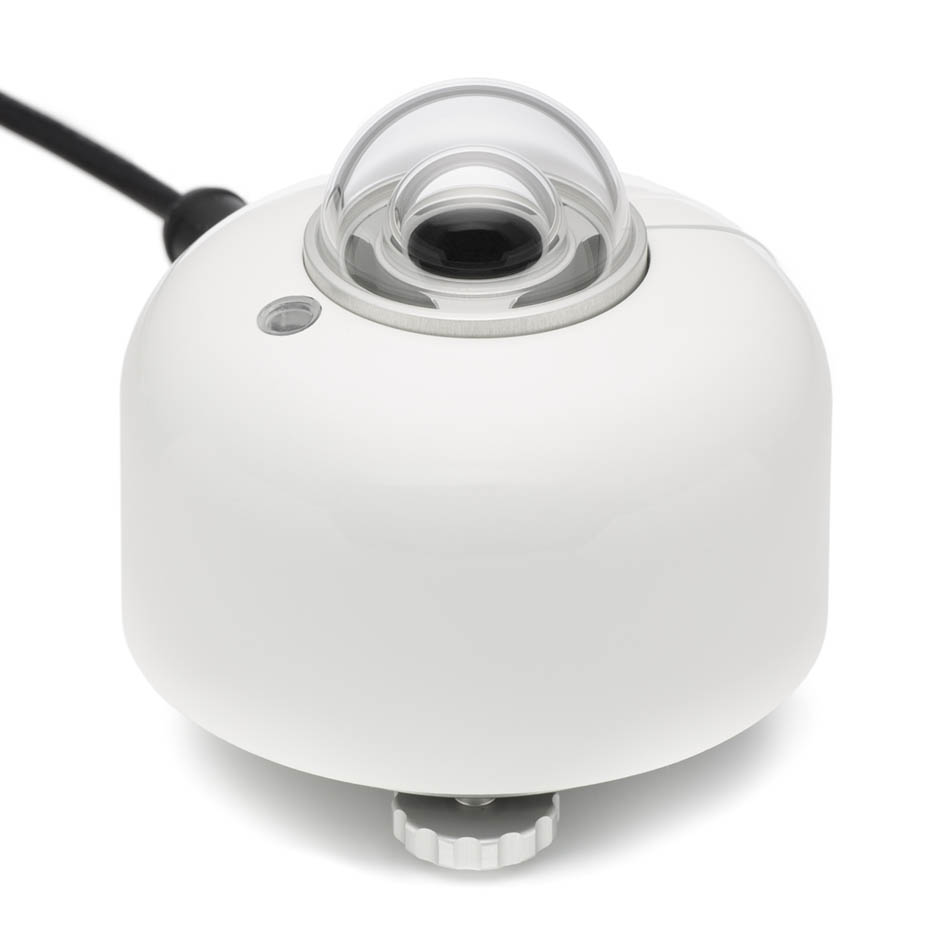
Typical ISO 9060 secondary standard pyranometer, model SR30.

ISO 9060, Specification and classification of instruments for measuring hemispherical solar and direct solar radiation, is an ISO standard for the classification of pyranometers and pyrheliometers.
